

This is a complete list of all 1534 Statutory Instruments published in the United Kingdom in the year 1989.

1–100

 Criminal Justice Act 1988 (Commencement No. 5) Order 1989 (S.I. 1989/1)
 Food Protection (Emergency Prohibitions) (Wales) (No.5) Amendment Order 1989 (S.I. 1989/2)
 Food Protection (Emergency Prohibitions) Order 1989 (S.I. 1989/3)
 Export of Sheep (Prohibition) (No. 2) Amendment Order 1989 (S.I. 1989/5)
 Food Protection (Emergency Prohibitions) (England) Amendment Order 1989 (S.I. 1989/6)
 Dairy Produce Quotas (Amendment) Regulations 1989 (S.I. 1989/16)
 Education (Higher Education Corporations) (No. 5) Order 1989 (S.I. 1989/17)
 Criminal Appeal (Reviews of Sentencing) Rules 1989 (S.I. 1989/19)
 Horses (Landing from Northern Ireland and the Republic of Ireland) (Revocation) Order 1989 (S.I. 1989/23)
 Home Loss Payments Order 1989 (S.I. 1989/24)
 National Savings Bank (Amendment) Regulations 1989 (S.I. 1989/25)
 Social Security (Contributions and Allocation of Contributions) (Re-rating) Order 1989 (S.I. 1989/26)
 Merger Reference (GEC, Siemens and Plessey) Order 1989 (S.I. 1989/27)
 Financial Services Act 1986 (Single Property Schemes) (Exemption) Regulations 1989 (S.I. 1989/28)
 Official Listing of Securities (Units in Single Property Schemes) Order 1989 (S.I. 1989/29)
 Rules of the Air and Air Traffic Control (Fifth Amendment) Regulations 1989 (S.I. 1989/30)
 Trade Union Ballots and Elections (Independent Scrutineer Qualifications) (Amendment) Order 1989 (S.I. 1989/31)
 Personal Community Charge (Students) (Scotland) Regulations 1989 (S.I. 1989/32)
 Submarine Pipe-lines (Designated Owners) Order 1989 (S.I. 1989/33)
 Submarine Pipe-lines (Designated Owners) (No. 2) Order 1989 (S.I. 1989/34)
 Income Tax (Building Societies) (Amendment) Regulations 1989 (S.I. 1989/36)
 Anglian Water Authority (Quidenham Borehole) Order 1989 (S.I. 1989/41)
 Social Security Benefits Up-rating Order 1989 (S.I. 1989/43)
 Education (Inner London Education Authority) (Transitional and Supplementary Provisions) Order 1989 (S.I. 1989/46)
 Home Loss Payment (Specification of Amount) (Scotland) Regulations 1989 (S.I. 1989/47)
 Act of Adjournal (Consolidation Amendment) (Reference to European Court) 1989 (S.I. 1989/48)
 Fire Services (Appointments and Promotion) (Scotland) Amendment Regulations 1989 (S.I. 1989/49)
 Criminal Justice Act 1988 (Commencement No. 6) Order 1989 (S.I. 1989/50)
 National Health Service Functions (Directions to Authorities and Administration Arrangements) Regulations 1989 (S.I. 1989/51)
 Welfare of Poultry (Transport) (Amendment) Order 1989 (S.I. 1989/52)
 River Purification Boards (Establishment) Variation (Scotland) Order 1989 (S.I. 1989/59)
 County of Powys (Electoral Arrangements) Order 1989 (S.I. 1989/60)
 Local Government Reorganisation (Compensation) (West Yorkshire) Order 1989 (S.I. 1989/62)
 Personal Community Charge (Exemptions) (Scotland) Regulations 1989 (S.I. 1989/63)
 Control of Pollution (Landed Ships' Waste) (Amendment) Regulations 1989 (S.I. 1989/65)
 South Eastern Police (Amalgamation) Amendment Scheme Order 1989 (S.I. 1989/66)
 South Eastern Combined Fire Area Administration (Amendment) Scheme Order 1989 (S.I. 1989/67)
 Rate Support Grant (Scotland) (No.2) Order 1988 Approved by the House of CommonsS.I. 1989/68)
 Revenue Support Grant (Scotland) Order 1988 Approved by the House of CommonsS.I. 1989/69)
 Grants by Local Housing Authorities (Appropriate Percentage and Exchequer Contributions) Order 1989 (S.I. 1989/72)
 Fire Safety and Safety of Places of Sport Act 1987 (Commencement No. 5) Order 1989 (S.I. 1989/75)
 Fire Precautions (Factories, Offices, Shops and Railway Premises) Order 1989 (S.I. 1989/76)
 Fire Precautions (Application for Certificate) Regulations 1989 (S.I. 1989/77)
 Fire Precautions (Non-Certificated Factory, Office, Shop and Railway Premises) (Revocation) Regulations 1989 (S.I. 1989/78)
 Fire Precautions Act 1971 (Modifications) (Revocation) Regulations 1989 (S.I. 1989/79)
Act of Sederunt (Consumer Arbitration Agreements) 1989 (S.I. 1989/80)
 Rent Assessment Committee (Assured Tenancies) (Scotland) Regulations 1989 (S.I. 1989/81)
 Merchant Shipping (Section 52 Inquiries) Rules (Amendment) Rules 1989 (S.I. 1989/84)
 Mostyn Docks (Pilotage) Harbour Revision Order 1989 (S.I. 1989/86)
 A483 Swansea-Manchester Trunk Road (Improvement at Bryn Sadwrn) Order 1989 (S.I. 1989/87)
 Bristol Development Corporation (Area and Constitution) Order 1988S.I. 1989/91)
 Bristol Development Corporation (Area and Constitution) (Amendment) Order 1988S.I. 1989/92)
 Bristol Development Corporation (Planning Functions) Order 1989 (S.I. 1989/93)
 The St. Edmundsbury (Parish of Haverhill) Order 1989 S.I. 1989/95
 Wireless Telegraphy (Broadcast Licence Charges and Exemption) (Amendment) Regulations 1989 (S.I. 1989/96)
 Commissioner for Local Administration in Scotland (Expenses) Regulations 1989 (S.I. 1989/98)
 Industrial Training Levy (Plastics Processing) Order 1989 (S.I. 1989/99)
 Merchant Shipping (Loading and Stability Assessment of Ro/Ro Passenger Ships) Regulations 1989 (S.I. 1989/100)

101–200

 Public Telecommunication System Designation (Southampton Cable Limited) Order 1989 (S.I. 1989/101)
 Merchant Shipping (Provisions and Water) Regulations 1989 (S.I. 1989/102)
 Nurses, Midwives and Health Visitors (Parts of the Register) Amendment Order 1989 (S.I. 1989/104)
 Road Traffic (Carriage of Dangerous Substances in Packages etc.) (Amendment) Regulations 1989 (S.I. 1989/105)
 Civil Courts (Amendment) Order 1989 (S.I. 1989/106)
 Civil Courts (Amendment No. 2) Order 1989 (S.I. 1989/107)
 The Dartford (Parishes) Order 1989 S.I. 1989/108
 Nurses, Midwives and Health Visitors (Health Visitors—Admission to Training) Amendment Rules Approval Order 1989 (S.I. 1989/109)
 General Practice Finance Corporation (Transfer of Property etc. and Abolition) Order 1989 (S.I. 1989/110)
 Health and Medicines Act 1988 (Commencement No. 2) Order 1989 (S.I. 1989/111)
 Poisons (Amendment) Rules 1989 (S.I. 1989/112)
 Customs Duties (Standard Exchange Relief and Outward Processing Relief) (Revocation) Regulations 1989 (S.I. 1989/116)
 Highland Regional Council (River Lael and Allt Gleann a Mhadaidh) Water Order 1989 (S.I. 1989/117)
 District of South Staffordshire (Electoral Arrangements) Order 1989 (S.I. 1989/119)
 Anglian Water Authority (Bircham Newton Borehole) Order 1989 (S.I. 1989/121)
 Monopolies and Mergers Commission (Performance of Functions) Order 1989 (S.I. 1989/122)
 Wireless Telegraphy Apparatus (Receivers) (Exemption) Regulations 1989 (S.I. 1989/123)
 County Council of the Royal County of Berkshire A329 Relief Road Special Road Scheme 1988 Confirmation Instrument 1989 (S.I. 1989/124)
 Banking Act 1987 (Exempt Persons) Order 1989 (S.I. 1989/125)
 Fishing Vessels (Safety Training) Regulations 1989 (S.I. 1989/126)
 County of West Glamorgan (Electoral Arrangements) Order 1989 (S.I. 1989/127)
 Farm and Conservation Grant Scheme 1989 (S.I. 1989/128)
 A65 and A660 Trunk Roads (Burley-in-Wharfedale Bypass) Order 1989 (S.I. 1989/130)
 A65 and A660 Trunk Roads (Burley-in-Wharfedale) (Detrunking) Order 1989 (S.I. 1989/131)
 Cambridgeshire, Essex, Hertfordshire and Lincolnshire (County Boundaries) Order 1989 (S.I. 1989/133)
 Social Security (Claims and Payments and Payments on account, Overpayments and Recovery) Amendment Regulations 1989 (S.I. 1989/136)
 Home Purchase Assistance (Price-limits) Order 1989 (S.I. 1989/137)
 Local Government Act 1988 (Defined Activities) (Competition) (Wales) (Variation) Regulations 1989 (S.I. 1989/138)
 Diseases of Animals (Protein Processing) (Amendment) Order 1989 (S.I. 1989/139)
 Babies' Dummies (Safety) (Revocation) Regulations 1989 (S.I. 1989/141)
 Cod (Specified Sea Areas) (Prohibition of Fishing) Order 1989 (S.I. 1989/142)
 Diseases of Animals (Approved Disinfectants) (Amendment) Order 1989 (S.I. 1989/144)
 Inverclyde Enterprise Zones Designation Order 1989 (S.I. 1989/145)
 Assured Tenancies and Agricultural Occupancies (Forms) (Amendment) Regulations 1989 (S.I. 1989/146)
 Town and Country Planning (Use Classes) (Scotland) Order 1989 (S.I. 1989/147)
 Town and Country Planning (General Development) (Scotland) Amendment Order 1989 (S.I. 1989/148)
 Gas Cooking Appliances (Safety) Regulations 1989 (S.I. 1989/149)
 Secretaries of State (Government Oil Pipe-line and Petroleum Licences) Order 1989 (S.I. 1989/150)
 Bermuda Constitution (Amendment) Order 1989 (S.I. 1989/151)
 Consular Fees Order 1989 (S.I. 1989/152)
 Hong Kong (Legislative Powers) Order 1989 (S.I. 1989/153)
 Agricultural Levy Reliefs (Frozen Beef and Veal) Order 1989 (S.I. 1989/154)
 St. Helena Constitution Order 1989 (S.I. 1989/155)
 Naval, Military and Air Forces etc. (Disablement and Death) Service Pensions Amendment Order 1989 (S.I. 1989/156)
 Copyright (International Conventions) (Amendment) Order 1989 (S.I. 1989/157)
 Education Reform Act 1988 (Commencement No. 5) Order 1989 (S.I. 1989/164)
 Education (Grants) (Grant-Maintained Schools Limited) Regulations 1989 (S.I. 1989/165)
 Adoption Allowance Schemes Order 1989 (S.I. 1989/166)
 Electricity and Pipe-line Works (Assessment of Environmental Effects) Regulations 1989 (S.I. 1989/167)
 Precept Limitation (Prescribed Maximum) (Inner London Education Authority) Order 1989 (S.I. 1989/171)
 Petty Sessional Divisions (West Sussex) Order 1989 (S.I. 1989/172)
 Housing (Right to Buy) (Prescribed Persons) Order 1989 (S.I. 1989/174)
 Secondary Examinations Council (Designation of Staff) Order 1989 (S.I. 1989/176)
 Rules of the Supreme Court (Amendment) 1989 (S.I. 1989/177)
 Calshot Oyster Fishery (Variation) Order 1989 (S.I. 1989/178)
 Housing Support Grant (Scotland) Order 1989 (S.I. 1989/181)
 Merchant Shipping (Crew Accommodation) (Amendment) Regulations 1989 (S.I. 1989/184)
 Education (Grants for Training of Teachers and Community Education Workers) (Scotland) Regulations 1989 (S.I. 1989/185)
 Superannuation (Children's Pensions) (Earnings Limit) Order 1989 (S.I. 1989/187)
 Community Service Orders Rules 1989 (S.I. 1989/191)
 Medicines Act 1968 (Commencement No. 8) Order 1989 (S.I. 1989/192)
 Town and Country Planning (Fees for Applications and Deemed Applications) Regulations 1989 (S.I. 1989/193)
 Adoption Allowance Schemes (Scotland) Order 1989 (S.I. 1989/194)
 (A453) North East of Birmingham–Nottingham Trunk Road (Diversion at Long Hedge Lane) Order 1989 (S.I. 1989/198)
 (A453) North East of Birmingham-Nottingham Trunk Road The Birmingham-Nottingham Route (A42 Ashby-de-la-Zouch to Kegworth Section Slip Roads) Order 1989 (S.I. 1989/199)
 (A453) North East of Birmingham–Nottingham Trunk Road The Birmingham–Nottingham Route (A42 Ashby-de-la-Zouch to Kegworth Section) Order 1986 Variation Order 1989 (S.I. 1989/200)

201–300

 Crick (Northamptonshire) to Doncaster Bypass Motorway Connecting Roads (No 2) Special Roads Supplementary Scheme 1986 Variation Scheme 1989 (S.I. 1989/201)
 North East of Birmingham–Nottingham Trunk Road (Breedon-On-The-Hill Bypass) Order 1957 Revocation Order 1989 (S.I. 1989/202)
 Housing Act 1988 (Commencement No. 3) Order 1989 (S.I. 1989/203)
 Highland Regional Council (Loch Beannach) Water Order 1989 (S.I. 1989/204)
 Certification Officer (Amendment of Fees) Regulations 1989 (S.I. 1989/205)
 Access to Personal Files (Social Services) Regulations 1989 (S.I. 1989/206)
 Building Societies (Deferred Shares) Order 1989 (S.I. 1989/207)
 Building Societies (Designated Capital Resources) (Deferred Shares) Order 1989 (S.I. 1989/208)
 Recreation Grounds (Revocation of Parish Council Byelaws) Order 1989 (S.I. 1989/209)
 Lincolnshire and Nottinghamshire (County Boundaries) Order 1989 (S.I. 1989/210)
 Building Societies (Designation of Qualifying Bodies) (Amendment) Order 1989 (S.I. 1989/215)
 Third Country Fishing (Enforcement) Order 1989 (S.I. 1989/217)
 Price Marking (Food) (Amendment) Order 1989 (S.I. 1989/218)
 Farm and Conservation Grant Regulations 1989 (S.I. 1989/219)
 Higher Education (Wales) Regulations 1989 (S.I. 1989/220)
 Local Authority Social Services (Designation of Functions) Order 1989 (S.I. 1989/222)
 City of Glasgow and East Kilbride Districts (Mid Lettrick Farm) Boundaries Amendment Order 1989 (S.I. 1989/223) (S. 22)
 Local Government Reorganisation (Croxteth Hall and Park) Order 1989 (S.I. 1989/224)
 Rate Limitation (Councils in England) (Prescribed Maximum) (Rates) Order 1989 (S.I. 1989/228)
 Severn-Trent Water Authority (Lee Brockhurst Boreholes) Order 1989 (S.I. 1989/229)
 Lothian and Borders Regions and Midlothian and Ettrick and Lauderdale Districts (Brothershiels) Boundaries Amendment Order 1989 (S.I. 1989/235) (S. 23)
 County Court (Amendment) Rules 1989 (S.I. 1989/236)
 Taunton–Fraddon Trunk Road A39 (Fairy Cross to Horns Cross Improvement) Order 1989 (S.I. 1989/237)
 Authorities for London Post-Graduate Teaching Hospitals Amendment Regulations 1989 (S.I. 1989/238)
 Housing (Right to Buy) (Prescribed Forms) (Amendment) Regulations 1989 (S.I. 1989/239)
 Housing (Right to Buy Delay Procedure) (Prescribed Forms) Regulations 1989 (S.I. 1989/240)
 Abolition of Domestic Rates (Domestic and Part Residential Subjects) (Scotland) Regulations 1989 (S.I. 1989/241)
 City of Glasgow and Eastwood Districts (Muirend Road/Netherlee Road) Boundaries Amendment Order 1989 (S.I. 1989/242) (S. 25)
 City of Glasgow and Strathkelvin Districts (Colston Road/Auchinairn Road) Boundaries Amendment Order 1989 (S.I. 1989/243) (S. 26)
 Warble Fly (England and Wales) (Amendment) Order 1989 (S.I. 1989/244)
 Misuse of Drugs (Licence Fees) (Amendment) Regulations 1989 (S.I. 1989/245)
 Export of Goods (Control) (Amendment No.2) Order 1989 (S.I. 1989/246)
 Heathrow Airport–London Noise Insulation Grants Scheme 1989 (S.I. 1989/247)
 Gatwick Airport—London Noise Insulation Grants Scheme 1989 (S.I. 1989/248)
 Access to Personal Files (Social Work) (Scotland) Regulations 1989 (S.I. 1989/251)
 Local Government Reorganisation (Capital Money) (Greater London) Order 1989 (S.I. 1989/255)
 Board of Inquiry (Army) (Amendment) Rules 1989 (S.I. 1989/256)
 Board of Inquiry (Air Force) (Amendment) Rules 1989 (S.I. 1989/257)
 High Court of Justiciary Fees Amendment Order 1989 (S.I. 1989/258)
 Sheriff Court Fees Amendment Order 1989 (S.I. 1989/259)
 Court of Session etc. Fees Amendment Order 1989 (S.I. 1989/260)
 Criminal Justice Act 1988 (Commencement No. 7) Order 1989 (S.I. 1989/264)
 Probation (Amendment) Rules 1989 (S.I. 1989/265)
 Sugar Beet (Research and Education) Order 1989 (S.I. 1989/266)
 Value Added Tax (Education) Order 1989 (S.I. 1989/267)
 The Tonbridge and Malling (Parishes) Order 1989 S.I. 1989/269
 Merchant Shipping (Weighing of Goods Vehicles and other Cargo) (Amendment) Regulations 1989 (S.I. 1989/270)
 Films (Exclusivity Agreements) Order 1989 (S.I. 1989/271)
 School Boards (Scotland) Act 1988 (Commencement) Order 1989 (S.I. 1989/272)
 School Boards (Scotland) Regulations 1989 (S.I. 1989/273)
 Industrial Training Levy (Construction Board) Order 1989 (S.I. 1989/274)
 Seeds (National Lists of Varieties) (Fees) (Amendment) Regulations 1989 (S.I. 1989/275)
 Plant Breeders' Rights (Fees) (Amendment) Regulations 1989 (S.I. 1989/276)
 Norfolk and Suffolk Broads (Staff and Property, etc.) Order 1989 (S.I. 1989/277)
 Education (Designated Institutions) Order 1989 (S.I. 1989/282)
 Carmarthen-Llandeilo Trunk Road A40 (Llandeilo Northern By-pass) Order 1989 (S.I. 1989/283)
 Bedfordshire and Hertfordshire (County Boundaries) Order 1989 (S.I. 1989/284)
 Zoonoses Order 1989 (S.I. 1989/285)
 Statutory Maternity Pay (Compensation of Employers) and Statutory Sick Pay (Additional Compensation of Employers) Amendment Regulations 1989 (S.I. 1989/286)
 Administration of Justice Act 1985 (Commencement No. 6) Order 1989 (S.I. 1989/287)
 Legal Aid Act 1988 (Commencement No.3) Order 1989 (S.I. 1989/288)
 Confirmation to Small Estates (Scotland) Order 1989 (S.I. 1989/289)
 Grampian and Highland Regions and Moray and Badenoch and Strathspey Districts (Dava/Aitnoch Farm) Boundaries Amendment Order 1989 (S.I. 1989/290) (S. 34)
 Finance Act 1986 (Stamp Duty Repeals) Order 1989 (S.I. 1989/291)
 Industrial Training Levy (Engineering Board) Order 1989 (S.I. 1989/292)
 Insurance (Fees) Regulations 1989 (S.I. 1989/293)
 Gaming Act (Variation of Fees) Order 1989 (S.I. 1989/294)
 Lotteries (Gaming Board Fees) Order 1989 (S.I. 1989/295)
 London Regional Transport (Levy) Order 1989 (S.I. 1989/296)
 Perth Harbour Revision Order 1988S.I. 1989/297)
 Teachers (Compensation for Redundancy and Premature Retirement) Regulations 1989 (S.I. 1989/298)
 Crown Court (Amendment) Rules 1989 (S.I. 1989/299)
 Magistrates' Courts (Amendment) Rules 1989 (S.I. 1989/300)

301–400

 Local Authorities (Allowances) (Scotland) Amendment Regulations 1989 (S.I. 1989/301)
 Education (Prescribed Courses of Higher Education) (England) Regulations 1989 (S.I. 1989/302)
 Civil Aviation (Route Charges for Navigation Services) Regulations 1989 (S.I. 1989/303)
 London Government Reorganisation (Hampstead Heath) Order 1989 (S.I. 1989/304)
 Merchant Shipping (Light Dues) Regulations 1989 (S.I. 1989/305)
 National Health Service (Charges to Overseas Visitors) Regulations 1989 (S.I. 1989/306)
 National Assistance (Charges for Accommodation) Regulations 1989 (S.I. 1989/307)
 Education (National Curriculum) (Attainment Targets and Programmes of Study in Mathematics) Order 1989 (S.I. 1989/308)
 Education (National Curriculum) (Attainment Targets and Programmes of Study in Science) Order 1989 (S.I. 1989/309)
 Air Quality Standards Regulations 1989 (S.I. 1989/317)
 Control of Industrial Air Pollution (Registration of Works) Regulations 1989 (S.I. 1989/318)
 Health and Safety (Emissions into the Atmosphere) (Amendment) Regulations 1989 (S.I. 1989/319)
 Goods Vehicles (Plating and Testing) (Amendment) Regulations 1989 (S.I. 1989/320)
 Motor Vehicles (Tests) (Amendment) Regulations 1989 (S.I. 1989/321)
 Public Service Vehicles (Conditions of Fitness, Equipment, Use and Certification) (Amendment) Regulations 1989 (S.I. 1989/322)
 Merchant Shipping (Fees) Regulations 1989 (S.I. 1989/323)
 Education (Grants) (Royal Ballet School) Regulations 1989 (S.I. 1989/324)
 Wireless Telegraphy (Broadcast Licence Charges and Exemption) (Amendment No. 2) Regulations 1989 (S.I. 1989/325)
 National Health Service (Charges for Drugs and Appliances) (Scotland) Regulations 1989 (S.I. 1989/326)
 Registered Housing Associations (Accounting Requirements) (Amendment) Order 1989 (S.I. 1989/327)
 Industrial Assurance (Fees) Regulations 1989 (S.I. 1989/328)
 Education (Teachers) (Amendment) Regulations 1989 (S.I. 1989/329)
 Prison (Amendment) Rules 1989 (S.I. 1989/330)
 Young Offender Institution (Amendment) Rules 1989 (S.I. 1989/331)
 London Government Reorganisation (Pipe Subways) Order 1989 (S.I. 1989/335)
 Water Resources (Licences) (Amendment) Regulations 1989 (S.I. 1989/336)
 Health and Medicines Act 1988 (Commencement No. 3) Order 1989 (S.I. 1989/337)
 Civil Legal Aid (Assessment of Resources) Regulations 1989 (S.I. 1989/338)
 Civil Legal Aid (General) Regulations 1989 (S.I. 1989/339)
 Legal Advice and Assistance Regulations 1989 (S.I. 1989/340)
 Legal Advice and Assistance (Duty Solicitor) (Remuneration) Regulations 1989 (S.I. 1989/341)
 Legal Advice and Assistance at Police Stations (Remuneration) Regulations 1989 (S.I. 1989/342)
 Legal Aid in Criminal and Care Proceedings (Costs) Regulations 1989 (S.I. 1989/343)
 Legal Aid in Criminal and Care Proceedings (General) Regulations 1989 (S.I. 1989/344)
 Social Security (Contributions) Amendment Regulations 1989 (S.I. 1989/345)
 A51/52 North of Newcastle-under-Lyme–Nantwich–Tarporley–Tarvin Trunk Road (Nantwich Bypass) Order 1989 (S.I. 1989/346)
 A51/A52 Trunk Roads Nantwich (Detrunking) Order 1989 (S.I. 1989/347)
 A59 Samlesbury–Skipton Trunk Road (Improvement from Greengates to Gutteridge) Order 1989 (S.I. 1989/348)
 Civil Aviation (Navigation Services Charges) (Fourth Amendment) Regulations 1989 (S.I. 1989/349)
 Motor Vehicles (Type Approval and Approval Marks) (Fees) Regulations 1989 (S.I. 1989/350)
 Education (Schools and Further and Higher Education) Regulations 1989 (S.I. 1989/351)
 Education (Mandatory Awards) (Amendment) Regulations 1989 (S.I. 1989/352)
 Merchant Shipping Act 1988 (Commencement No. 3) Order 1989 (S.I. 1989/353)
 Export of Goods (Control) (Amendment No. 3) Order 1989 (S.I. 1989/354)
 Building Societies (General Charge and Fees) Regulations 1989 (S.I. 1989/355)
 Friendly Societies (Fees) Regulations 1989 (S.I. 1989/356)
 Industrial and Provident Societies (Amendment of Fees) Regulations 1989 (S.I. 1989/357)
 Industrial and Provident Societies (Credit Unions) (Amendment of Fees) Regulations 1989 (S.I. 1989/358)
 Housing Benefit (Community Charge Rebates) (Scotland) Amendment Regulations 1989 (S.I. 1989/361)
 Gaming Act (Variation of Fees) (Scotland) Order 1989 (S.I. 1989/362)
 National Health Service (Dental Charges) (Scotland) Regulations 1989 (S.I. 1989/363)
 National Health Service (Charges to Overseas Visitors) (Scotland) Regulations 1989 (S.I. 1989/364)
 PARLIAMENT S.I. 1989/365)
 Capital Allowances (Corresponding Northern Ireland Grants) Order 1989 (S.I. 1989/366)
 Housing (Change of Landlord) Regulations 1989 (S.I. 1989/367)
 Housing (Preservation of Right to Buy) Regulations 1989 (S.I. 1989/368)
 Education (Higher Education Corporations) (Designated Staff) Order 1989 (S.I. 1989/369)
 Education (Pre-Scheme Financial Statements) Regulations 1989 (S.I. 1989/370)
 Local Government Superannuation (Amendment) Regulations 1989 (S.I. 1989/371)
 Local Government (Superannuation and Compensation) (Amendment) Regulations 1989 (S.I. 1989/372)
 Motor Vehicles (Driving Licences) (Amendment) Regulations 1989 (S.I. 1989/373)
 Housing (Change of Landlord) (Prescribed Forms) Regulations 1989 (S.I. 1989/374)
 General Optical Council (Contact Lens (Qualifications etc.) (Amendment) Rules) Order of Council 1989 (S.I. 1989/375)
 Milk and Dairies and Milk (Special Designation) (Charges) (Amendment) Regulations 1989 (S.I. 1989/376)
 Education (Prescribed Public Examinations) Regulations 1989 (S.I. 1989/377)
 Teachers' Superannuation (Amendment) Regulations 1989 (S.I. 1989/378)
 Social Fund Maternity and Funeral Expenses (General) Amendment Regulations 1989 (S.I. 1989/379)
 Dairy Produce Quotas Regulations 1989 (S.I. 1989/380)
 County Court (Amendment No. 2) Rules 1989 (S.I. 1989/381)
 Family Law Reform Act 1987 (Commencement No. 2) Order 1989 (S.I. 1989/382)
 Magistrates' Courts (Custodianship Orders) (Amendment) Rules 1989 (S.I. 1989/383)
 Magistrates' Courts (Family Law Reform Act 1987) (Miscellaneous Amendments) Rules 1989 (S.I. 1989/384)
 Matrimonial Causes (Costs) (Amendment) Rules 1989 (S.I. 1989/385)
 Rules of the Supreme Court (Amendment No.2) 1989 (S.I. 1989/386)
 National Health Service (General Ophthalmic Services) (Scotland) Amendment Regulations 1989 (S.I. 1989/387)
 Criminal Legal Aid (Scotland) (Fees) Amendment Regulations 1989 (S.I. 1989/388)
 Legal Aid (Scotland) (Fees in Civil Proceedings) Amendment Regulations 1989 (S.I. 1989/389)
 Legal Aid (Scotland) (Fees in Criminal Proceedings) Amendment Regulations 1989 (S.I. 1989/390)
 Civil Legal Aid (Scotland) (Fees) Amendment Regulations 1989 (S.I. 1989/391)
 National Health Service (Optical Charges and Payments) (Scotland) Regulations 1989 (S.I. 1989/392)
 National Health Service (Travelling Expenses and Remission of Charges) (Scotland) Amendment Regulations 1989 (S.I. 1989/393)
 National Health Service (Dental Charges) Regulations 1989 (S.I. 1989/394)
 National Health Service (General Ophthalmic Services) Amendment Regulations 1989 (S.I. 1989/395)
 National Health Service (Optical Charges and Payments) Regulations 1989 (S.I. 1989/396)
 Insolvency (Amendment) Rules 1989 (S.I. 1989/397)
 Education (School Hours and Policies) (Information) Regulations 1989 (S.I. 1989/398)

401–500

 The North Bedfordshire (Parishes) Order 1989 S.I. 1989/402
 Housing Act 1988 (Commencement No. 4) Order 1989 (S.I. 1989/404)
 Education (Bulmershe College of Higher Education Higher Education Corporation) (Dissolution) Order 1989 (S.I. 1989/408)
 Education (West Midlands College of Higher Education Higher Education Corporation) (Dissolution) Order 1989 (S.I. 1989/409)
 Education (Cambridgeshire College of Arts and Technology Higher Education Corporation) (Dissolution) Order 1989 (S.I. 1989/410)
 A627(M) (Rochdale—Lancashire/Yorkshire Motorway (M62)—Oldham) Special Roads Scheme 1989 (S.I. 1989/411)
 Personal Injuries (Civilians) Amendment Scheme 1989 (S.I. 1989/415)
 Housing Benefit (General) Amendment Regulations 1989 (S.I. 1989/416)
 Pensions Increase (Local Authorities' etc. Pensions) (Amendment) Regulations 1989 (S.I. 1989/417)
 Medicines (Fees Relating to Medicinal Products for Human Use) Regulations 1989 (S.I. 1989/418)
 National Health Service (Charges for Drugs and Appliances) Regulations 1989 (S.I. 1989/419)
 Injuries in War (Shore Employments) Compensation (Amendment) Scheme 1989 (S.I. 1989/420)
 Lloyd's Underwriters (Tax) Regulations 1989 (S.I. 1989/421)
 Housing (Scotland) (Superannuation Fund) Regulations 1989 (S.I. 1989/422)
 Right To Purchase From A Public Sector Landlord (Application Form) (Scotland) Regulations 1989 (S.I. 1989/423)
 Harbour Works (Assessment of Environmental Effects) (No.2) Regulations 1989 (S.I. 1989/424)
 Sea Fish Industry Authority (Levy) Regulations 1988 Confirmatory Order 1989 (S.I. 1989/425)
 Sea Fishing (Enforcement of Community Conservation Measures) (Amendment) Order 1989 (S.I. 1989/426)
 A62 (Gelderd Road, Gildersome Interchange) (Trunking) Order 1989 (S.I. 1989/427)
 European Parliamentary Elections (Welsh Forms) Order 1989 (S.I. 1989/428)
 Representation of the People (Welsh Forms) Order 1989 (S.I. 1989/429)
 Housing and Planning Act 1986 (Commencement No. 13) Order 1989 (S.I. 1989/430)
 Financial Services Act 1986 (Miscellaneous Exemptions) Order 1989 (S.I. 1989/431)
 National Assistance (Charges for Accommodation) (Scotland) Regulations 1989 (S.I. 1989/432)
 Grant-aided Colleges (Scotland) Grant Regulations 1989 (S.I. 1989/433)
 Act of Sederunt (Fees of Solicitors in the Sheriff Court) 1989 (S.I. 1989/434)
 Act of Sederunt (Rules of the Court of Session Amendment No.1) (Written Statements) 1989 (S.I. 1989/435)
 Act of Sederunt (Amendment of Ordinary Cause and Summary Cause Rules) (Written Statements) 1989 (S.I. 1989/436)
 Public Trustee (Fees) (Amendment) Order 1989 (S.I. 1989/437)
 Community Charges (Administration and Enforcement) Regulations 1989 (S.I. 1989/438)
 Valuation and Community Charge Tribunals Regulations 1989 (S.I. 1989/439)
 Valuation and Community Charge Tribunals (Transfer of Jurisdiction) Regulations 1989 (S.I. 1989/440)
 Valuation for Rating (Plant and Machinery) Regulations 1989 (S.I. 1989/441)
 Personal Community Charge (Exemptions) Order 1989 (S.I. 1989/442)
 Personal Community Charge (Students) Regulations 1989 (S.I. 1989/443)
 Further Education (Approved Associations) (Scotland) Grant Regulations 1989 (S.I. 1989/444)
 Act of Sederunt (Rules of the Court of Session Amendment No.2) (Solicitors' Fees) 1989 (S.I. 1989/445)
 National Health Service (Functions of Health Boards) (Scotland) Order 1989 (S.I. 1989/446)
 M1 Motorway (Stourton Interchange to Dewsbury Road Section) and Connecting Roads Scheme 1989 (S.I. 1989/447)
 M606 The Bradford (Oakenshaw–Staygate) Motorway Scheme 1967 (Revocation) Scheme 1988 Confirmation Instrument 1989 (S.I. 1989/448)
 M606 Motorway (Bradford Ring Road to M62 Chain Bar Interchange Section) and Connecting Roads Scheme 1989 (S.I. 1989/449)
 M621 Motorway (Ring Road, Beeston to Dewsbury Road Section) and Connecting Roads Scheme 1989 (S.I. 1989/450)
 Kirklees Metropolitan Council (M606 Motorway (Bradford Ring Road to M62 Chain Bar Interchange Section) and Connecting Roads) (Part) (Revocation) Scheme 1988 Confirmation Instrument 1989 (S.I. 1989/451)
 Leeds City Council (Urban Motorway) Special Road Schemes (Revocation) Scheme 1988 Confirmation Instrument 1989 (S.I. 1989/452)
 Social Security Benefits Up-rating Regulations 1989 (S.I. 1989/455)
 A15 Trunk Road (Bonby Lodge Slip Roads) Order 1989 (S.I. 1989/456)
 Health and Safety (Fees) Regulations 1989 (S.I. 1989/462)
 Grants to the Redundant Churches Fund Order 1989 (S.I. 1989/463)
 Service Subsidy Agreements (Tendering) (Amendment) Regulations 1989 (S.I. 1989/464)
 Banking Act 1987 (Exempt Transactions) (Amendment) Regulations 1989 (S.I. 1989/465)
 Capital Gains Tax (Annual Exempt Amount) Order 1989 (S.I. 1989/466)
 Income Tax (Indexation) Order 1989 (S.I. 1989/467)
 Inheritance Tax (Indexation) Order 1989 (S.I. 1989/468)
 Personal Equity Plan Regulations 1989 (S.I. 1989/469)
 Value Added Tax (Fund-Raising Events and Charities) Order 1989 (S.I. 1989/470)
 Value Added Tax (Increase of Registration Limits) Order 1989 (S.I. 1989/471)
 Value Added Tax (Self-supply of Construction Services) Order 1989 (S.I. 1989/472)
 Finance Act 1988 (Commencement) Order 1989 (S.I. 1989/473)
 North Western and North Wales Sea Fisheries District (Variation) Order 1989 (S.I. 1989/474)
 Community Charges (Information Concerning Social Security) Regulations 1989 (S.I. 1989/475)
Community Charges (Information Concerning Social Security) (Scotland) Regulations 1989 (S.I. 1989/476)
 Pensions Increase (Review) Order 1989 (S.I. 1989/477)
 Local Authorities (Armorial Bearings) Order 1989 (S.I. 1989/478)
 Child Abduction and Custody (Parties to Conventions) Order 1989 (S.I. 1989/479)
 CSCE Information Forum (Immunities and Privileges) Order 1989 (S.I. 1989/480)
 Foreign Compensation (Financial Provisions) Order 1989 (S.I. 1989/481)
 Territorial Sea (Limits) Order 1989 (S.I. 1989/482)
 Social Security (Isle of Man) Order 1989 (S.I. 1989/483)
 Appropriation (Northern Ireland) Order 1989 (S.I. 1989/484)
 Drug Trafficking Offences Act 1986 (United States of America) Order 1989 (S.I. 1989/485)
 European Parliamentary Constituencies (England) (Miscellaneous Changes) Order 1989 (S.I. 1989/486)
 European Parliamentary Constituencies (Wales) (Miscellaneous Changes) Order 1989 (S.I. 1989/487)
 Immigration (Jersey) (Variation) Order 1989 (S.I. 1989/488)
 Interception of Communications Act 1985 (Isle of Man) Order 1989 (S.I. 1989/489)
 Laganside Development(Northern Ireland) Order 1989 (S.I. 1989/490)
 Local Elections (Variation of Limits of Candidates' Election Expenses) (Northern Ireland) Order 1989 (S.I. 1989/491)
 Nature Conservation and Amenity Lands (Amendment) (Northern Ireland) Order 1989 (S.I. 1989/492)
 Patents, Designs and Marks Act 1986 (Amendments to the Registered Designs Act 1949 and the Patents Act 1977) (Isle of Man) Order 1989 (S.I. 1989/493)
 European Parliamentary Constituencies (Scotland) (Miscellaneous Changes) Order 1989 (S.I. 1989/494)
 Transfer of Functions (Transport Tribunal) Order 1989 (S.I. 1989/495)
 General Medical Council (Constitution) Amendment Order 1989 (S.I. 1989/496)
 Registration of Births and Deaths (Amendment) Regulations 1989 (S.I. 1989/497)
 Personal and Occupational Pension Schemes (Miscellaneous Amendments) Regulations 1989 (S.I. 1989/500)

501–600

 Education Reform Act 1988 (Commencement No. 6) Order 1989 (S.I. 1989/501)
 European Parliamentary Elections (Northern Ireland) (Amendment) Regulations 1989 (S.I. 1989/502)
 Access to Personal Files (Housing) Regulations 1989 (S.I. 1989/503)
 Testing of Poultry Flocks Order 1989 (S.I. 1989/504)
 Civil Legal Aid (Scotland) Amendment Regulations 1989 (S.I. 1989/505)
 Advice and Assistance (Scotland) Amendment Regulations 1989 (S.I. 1989/506)
Community Charges (Deductions from Income Support) (Scotland) Regulations 1989 (S.I. 1989/507)
 Offshore Installations (Safety Zones) Order 1989 (S.I. 1989/508)
 Northern Ireland (Emergency Provisions) Acts 1978 and 1987 (Continuance) Order 1989 (S.I. 1989/509)
 Northern Ireland (Emergency Provisions) (Amendment) Regulations 1989 (S.I. 1989/510)
 Registration of Births and Deaths (Welsh Language) (Amendment) Regulations 1989 (S.I. 1989/511)
 Housing (Preservation of Right to Buy) (Amendment) Regulations 1989 (S.I. 1989/512)
 Housing (Right to Buy) (Maximum Discount) Order 1989 (S.I. 1989/513)
 National Health Service (Travelling Expenses and Remission of Charges) Amendment Regulations 1989 (S.I. 1989/517)
 M40 (London–Oxford) Motorway (Stokenchurch to Waterstock Crossroads Section) Variation Scheme 1989 (S.I. 1989/521)
 M40 London-Oxford-Birmingham Motorway (Waterstock to Wendlebury Section) and Connecting Roads Scheme 1989 (S.I. 1989/522)
 Social Security Benefit (Dependency) Amendment Regulations 1989 (S.I. 1989/523)
 Welfare Food Amendment Regulations 1989 (S.I. 1989/524)
 Workmen's Compensation (Supplementation) Amendment Scheme 1989 (S.I. 1989/525)
 Employment Protection (Variation of Limits) Order 1989 (S.I. 1989/526)
 Unfair Dismissal (Increase of Compensation Limit) Order 1989 (S.I. 1989/527)
 Unfair Dismissal (Increase of Limits of Basic and Special Awards) Order 1989 (S.I. 1989/528)
 Food Protection (Emergency Prohibitions) (Sea Fish) Order 1989 (S.I. 1989/529)
 Erskine Bridge Regulations 1989 (S.I. 1989/530)
 Redundancy Payments (Local Government) (Modification) (Amendment) Order 1989 (S.I. 1989/532)
 Preservatives in Food Regulations 1989 (S.I. 1989/533)
 Income Support (General) Amendment Regulations 1989 (S.I. 1989/534)
 Gaming Clubs (Hours and Charges) (Amendment) Regulations 1989 (S.I. 1989/535)
 Gaming Act (Variation of Monetary Limits) Order 1989 (S.I. 1989/536)
 Cod (Specified Sea Areas) (Prohibition of Fishing) (No. 2) Order 1989 (S.I. 1989/537)
 African Development Bank (Further Subscription to Capital Stock) Order 1989 (S.I. 1989/538)
 African Development Fund (Fifth Replenishment) Order 1989 (S.I. 1989/539)
 War Pensions (Miscellaneous Amendments) Order 1989 (S.I. 1989/540)
 Yorkshire Water Authority (Ryburn Valley Water Supply) Order 1989 (S.I. 1989/544)
 Motor Fuel (Lead Content of Petrol) (Amendment) Regulations 1989 (S.I. 1989/547)
 Civil Legal Aid (Matrimonial Proceedings) Regulations 1989 (S.I. 1989/549)
 Legal Advice and Assistance (Scope) Regulations 1989 (S.I. 1989/550)
 Legal Aid (Functions) Order 1989 (S.I. 1989/551)
 Pneumoconiosis etc. (Workers' Compensation) (Payment of Claims) (Amendment) Regulations 1989 (S.I. 1989/552)
 Plant Health (Great Britain) (Amendment) Order 1989 (S.I. 1989/553)
 Gipsy Encampments (Borough of Arfon) Order 1989 (S.I. 1989/555)
 Civil Evidence (Scotland) Act 1988 (Commencement) Order 1989 (S.I. 1989/556)
 A59 Samlesbury – Skipton Trunk Road (Improvement from East of Monk Bridge to West of Crooks House) Order 1989 (S.I. 1989/557)
 A59 Samlesbury-Skipton Trunk Road (Improvement from West of Yarlside Lane (B6251) to East of Monk Bridge) Order 1989 (S.I. 1989/558)
 Legal Advice and Assistance (Amendment) Regulations 1989 (S.I. 1989/560)
 Wireless Telegraphy (Control of Interference from Fluorescent Lighting Apparatus) (Amendment) Regulations 1989 (S.I. 1989/561)
 Wireless Telegraphy (Control of Interference from Household Appliances, Portable Tools etc.) (Amendment) Regulations 1989 (S.I. 1989/562)
 Combined Probation Areas (West Sussex) Order 1989 (S.I. 1989/563)
 Police Federation (Amendment) Regulations 1989 (S.I. 1989/564)
 Housing Benefit (General) Amendment No. 2 Regulations 1989 (S.I. 1989/566)
 Merchant Shipping (Loading and Stability Assessment of Ro/Ro Passenger Ships) (Non-United Kingdom Ships) Regulations 1989 (S.I. 1989/567)
 Merchant Shipping (Weighing of Goods Vehicles and other Cargo) (Application to non-UK Ships) Regulations 1989 (S.I. 1989/568)
 Social Security (Contributions) Amendment (No. 2) Regulations 1989 (S.I. 1989/571)
 Social Security (Contributions) Amendment (No. 3) Regulations 1989 (S.I. 1989/572)
 Coal Industry (Restructuring Grants) Order 1989 (S.I. 1989/573)
 Beef Special Premium (Protection of Payments) Order 1989 (S.I. 1989/574)
 Beef Special Premium (Recovery Powers) Regulations 1989 (S.I. 1989/575)
 Cereals Co-responsibility Levy (Amendment) Regulations 1989 (S.I. 1989/576)
 Town and Country Planning (Determination of Appeals by Appointed Persons) (Prescribed Classes) (Scotland) Amendment Regulations 1989 (S.I. 1989/577)
 Rent Officers (Additional Functions) (Scotland) Order 1989 (S.I. 1989/578)
 Preservatives in Food (Scotland) Regulations 1989 (S.I. 1989/581)
 Evidence in Divorce Actions (Scotland) Order 1989 (S.I. 1989/582)
 Medicines (Fees Relating to Medicinal Products for Animal Use) Regulations 1989 (S.I. 1989/583)
 Rent Officers (Additional Functions) Order 1989 (S.I. 1989/590)
 Consumer Credit (Cancellation Notices and Copies of Documents) (Amendment) Regulations 1989 (S.I. 1989/591)
 Consumer Credit (Total Charge for Credit and Rebate on Early Settlement) (Amendment) Regulations 1989 (S.I. 1989/596)
 Education (Listed Bodies) (Amendment) Order 1989 (S.I. 1989/597)
 Education (Recognised Awards) (Amendment) Order 1989 (S.I. 1989/598)
 British Railways Board (Vale of Rheidol) Light Railway (Amendment) Order 1989 (S.I. 1989/599)
 Gipsy Encampments (Borough of Dacorum) Order 1989 (S.I. 1989/600)

601–700

 Gipsy Encampments (District of Welwyn Hatfield) Order 1989 (S.I. 1989/601)
 National Health Service (General Dental Services) (Scotland) Amendment Regulations 1989 (S.I. 1989/602)
 Town and Country Planning General Development (Amendment) Order 1989 (S.I. 1989/603)
 Wireless Telegraphy Apparatus (Low Power Devices) (Exemption) Regulations 1989 (S.I. 1989/604)
 Housing Benefit (Subsidy) Order 1989 (S.I. 1989/607)
 National Health Service (General Dental Services) Amendment Regulations 1989 (S.I. 1989/613)
 National Health Service (Travelling Expenses and Remission of Charges) Amendment (No. 2) Regulations 1989 (S.I. 1989/614)
 Road Traffic (Carriage of Explosives) Regulations 1989 (S.I. 1989/615)
 National Health Service (Travelling Expenses and Remission of Charges) (Scotland) Amendment (No.2) Regulations 1989 (S.I. 1989/616)
 A59 Samlesbury–Skipton Trunk Road (Improvement from Crooks House to Bentha Hill) Order 1989 (S.I. 1989/617)
 Food Protection (Emergency Prohibitions) (Sea Fish) (Revocation) Order 1989 (S.I. 1989/619)
 Measuring Instruments (EEC Requirements) (Fees) (Amendment) Regulations 1989 (S.I. 1989/620)
 Distress for Rates (Amendment) Order 1989 (S.I. 1989/621)
 Gaming Clubs (Hours and Charges) (Scotland) Amendment Regulations 1989 (S.I. 1989/622)
 Gaming Act (Variation of Monetary Limits) (Scotland) Order 1989 (S.I. 1989/623)
 Seed Potatoes (Fees) Regulations 1989 (S.I. 1989/632)
 European Parliamentary Elections (Amendment) Regulations 1989 (S.I. 1989/633)
 Representation of the People (Variation of Limits of Candidates' Election Expenses) Order 1989 (S.I. 1989/634)
 Electricity at Work Regulations 1989 (S.I. 1989/635)
 Merger Reference (Strong & Fisher, Hillsdown and Pittard Garnar) (Revocation) Order 1989 (S.I. 1989/636)
 Unitary Development Plans (Tyne and Wear) (Appointed Day) Order 1989 (S.I. 1989/637)
 European Economic Interest Grouping Regulations 1989 (S.I. 1989/638)
 Premium Savings Bonds (Amendment) Regulations 1989 (S.I. 1989/639)
 Pig Carcase (Grading) (Amendment) Regulations 1989 (S.I. 1989/644)
 New Street Byelaws (Extension of Operation) (Amendment) Order 1989 (S.I. 1989/645)
 National Savings Stock Register (Amendment) Regulations 1989 (S.I. 1989/652)
 A34 Winchester—Preston Trunk Road (Henley-In-Arden to Hockley Heath section) Trunking Order 1988S.I. 1989/653)
 (A4123) East of Birmingham–Birkenhead Trunk Road (De-Trunking at the Junction of Wolverhampton Road and Hagley Road West) Order 1989 (S.I. 1989/654)
 Food Protection (Emergency Prohibitions) Amendment Order 1989 (S.I. 1989/655)
 General Medical Council Preliminary Proceedings Committee and Professional Conduct Committee (Procedure) Rules (Amendment) Order of Council 1989 (S.I. 1989/656)
 A13 Trunk Road (Lakeside Link Road) Order 1989 (S.I. 1989/657)
 Food Protection (Emergency Prohibitions) (England) Amendment No. 2 Order 1989 (S.I. 1989/658)
 Export of Sheep (Prohibition) (No. 2) Amendment No. 2 Order 1989 (S.I. 1989/659)
 Food Protection (Emergency Prohibitions) (Wales) (No. 5) Amendment No. 2 Order 1989 (S.I. 1989/660)
 Processed Animal Protein Order 1989 (S.I. 1989/661)
 Merchant Shipping (Merchant Navy Reserve) Regulations 1989 (S.I. 1989/662)
 Teachers' Superannuation (Scotland) Amendment Regulations 1989 (S.I. 1989/666)
 Borough of Colwyn (Electoral Arrangements) Order 1989 (S.I. 1989/668)
 Air Navigation (General) (Third Amendment) Regulations 1989 (S.I. 1989/669)
 Town and Country Planning (Control of Advertisements) Regulations 1989 (S.I. 1989/670)
 Southern Sea Fisheries District Order 1989 (S.I. 1989/671)
 Health and Safety at Work etc. Act 1974 (Application outside Great Britain) (Variation) Order 1989 (S.I. 1989/672)
 Recognition of Trusts Act 1987 (Overseas Territories) Order 1989 (S.I. 1989/673)
 Criminal Justice Act 1987 (Guernsey) Order 1989 (S.I. 1989/674)
 Criminal Justice Act 1987 (Jersey) Order 1989 (S.I. 1989/675)
 Immigration (Guernsey) (Variation) Order 1989 (S.I. 1989/676)
 Matrimonial and Family Proceedings (Northern Ireland) Order 1989 (S.I. 1989/677)
 Matrimonial and Family Proceedings (Northern Ireland Consequential Amendment) Order 1989 (S.I. 1989/678)
 Merchant Shipping Act 1988 (Isle of Man) Order 1989 (S.I. 1989/679)
 Motor Vehicles (Wearing of Rear Seat Belts by Children) (Northern Ireland) Order 1989 (S.I. 1989/680)
 Lord Chancellor's Salary Order 1989 (S.I. 1989/681)
 Health and Safety Information for Employees Regulations 1989 (S.I. 1989/682)
 Local Government (Allowances) (Amendment) Regulations 1989 (S.I. 1989/683)
 Medicines (Fixing of Fees Relating to Medicinal Products for Human Use) Order 1989 (S.I. 1989/684)
 Assured Tenancies (Rent Information) (Scotland) Order 1989 (S.I. 1989/685)
 Sea Fish (Marketing Standards) (Amendment) Regulations 1989 (S.I. 1989/687)
 Pilotage Authorities (1988 Returns) Order 1988S.I. 1989/689)
 Gaming (Bingo) Act (Fees) (Amendment) Order 1989 (S.I. 1989/693)
 National Police Records (Recordable Offences) (Amendment) Regulations 1989 (S.I. 1989/694)

701–800

 Meters (Certification) (Fees) Regulations 1989 (S.I. 1989/701)
 Police Cadets (Scotland) Amendment Regulations 1989 (S.I. 1989/702)
 Pensions Increase (Approved Schemes) (National Health Service) Amendment Regulations 1989 (S.I. 1989/711)
 Community Charges (Administration and Enforcement) (Amendment) Regulations 1989 (S.I. 1989/712)
 Motorcycles (Sound Level Measurement Certificates) (Amendment) Regulations 1989 (S.I. 1989/713)
 Woolwich Ferry Order 1989 (S.I. 1989/714)
 Anglian Water Authority (West Drain Discharge) Order 1989 (S.I. 1989/716)
 Gipsy Encampments (Borough of Dacorum) (No. 2) Order 1989 (S.I. 1989/717)
 Education Reform Act 1988 (Commencement No. 7) Order 1989 (S.I. 1989/719)
 Civil Legal Aid (Financial Conditions) (Scotland) Regulations 1989 (S.I. 1989/720)
 Advice and Assistance (Financial Conditions) (Scotland) Regulations 1989 (S.I. 1989/721)
 Southern Water Authority 1989 (S.I. 1989/722)
 Low Voltage Electrical Equipment (Safety) Regulations 1989 (S.I. 1989/728)
 Building Societies (Money Transmission Services) Order 1989 (S.I. 1989/730)
 Firemen's Pension Scheme (Amendment) Order 1989 (S.I. 1989/731)
 Firemen's Pension Scheme (Amendment) (No. 2) Order 1989 (S.I. 1989/732)
 Police Pensions (Amendment) Regulations 1989 (S.I. 1989/733)
 Liverpool–Leeds–Hull Trunk Road (Howden Bypass) (Revocation) Order 1989 (S.I. 1989/734)
 Community Charges (Notification of Deaths) (Scotland) Amendment Regulations 1989 (S.I. 1989/735)
 Education (Grant) (St. Augustine's School) Regulations 1989 (S.I. 1989/736)
 Returning Officers' Expenses (Amendment) Regulations 1989 (S.I. 1989/741)
 Local Government Reorganisation (Property)(West Yorkshire) Order 1989 (S.I. 1989/743)
 Removal, Storage and Disposal of Vehicles (Prescribed Sums and Charges etc.) Regulations 1989 (S.I. 1989/744)
 Vehicles (Charges for Release from Immobilisation Devices) Regulations 1989 (S.I. 1989/745)
 A38 Trunk Road (Marsh Mills Junction Improvement) Order 1989 (S.I. 1989/746)
 A38 Trunk Road (Marsh Mills Junction Improvement) (Detrunking) Order 1989 (S.I. 1989/747)
 Submarine Pipe-lines (Designated Owners) (No. 3) Order 1989 (S.I. 1989/751)
 Submarine Pipe-lines (Designated Owners) (No. 4) Order 1989 (S.I. 1989/752)
 Submarine Pipe-lines (Designated Owners) (No.5) Order 1989 (S.I. 1989/753)
 Submarine Pipe-lines (Designated Owners) (No.6) Order 1989 (S.I. 1989/754)
 Submarine Pipe-lines (Designated Owners) (No. 7) Order 1989 (S.I. 1989/755)
 Submarine Pipe-lines (Designated Owners) (No. 8) Order 1989 (S.I. 1989/756)
 Submarine Pipe-lines (Designated Owners) (No. 9) Order 1989 (S.I. 1989/757)
 Submarine Pipe-lines (Designated Owners) (No. 10) Order 1989 (S.I. 1989/758)
 Submarine Pipe-lines (Designated Owners) (No. 11) Order 1989 (S.I. 1989/759)
 Motor Vehicles (Driving Licences) (Amendment) (No. 2) Regulations 1989 (S.I. 1989/762)
 Prosecution of Offences (Custody Time Limits) (Amendment) Regulations 1989 (S.I. 1989/767)
 Food Labelling (Amendment) Regulations 1989 (S.I. 1989/768)
 Port of London Authority Harbour Revision Order 1989 (S.I. 1989/774)
 Medway Ports Authority Harbour Revision Order 1989 (S.I. 1989/775)
 Blood Tests (Evidence of Paternity) (Amendment) Regulations 1989 (S.I. 1989/776)
 Act of Sederunt (Shorthand Writers' Fees) 1989 (S.I. 1989/777)
 Act of Sederunt (Rules of the Court of Session Amendment No.3) (Shorthand Writers' Fees) 1989 (S.I. 1989/778)
 General Optical Council Contact Lens (Specification) Rules Order of Council 1989 (S.I. 1989/791)

801–900

 Land Registration Rules 1989 (S.I. 1989/801)
 Local Government Superannuation (Scotland) Amendment Regulations 1989 (S.I. 1989/802)
 National Health Service (Superannuation) Amendment Regulations 1989 (S.I. 1989/804)
 Social Security Revaluation of Earnings Factors Order 1989 (S.I. 1989/805)
 National Health Service (Superannuation) (Scotland) Amendment Regulations 1989 (S.I. 1989/807)
 Teachers' Superannuation (Scotland) Amendment (No.2) Regulations 1989 (S.I. 1989/808)
 Food Labelling (Scotland) Amendment Regulations 1989 (S.I. 1989/809)
 Teachers' Superannuation (Amendment) (No. 2) Regulations 1989 (S.I. 1989/811)
 South Yorkshire Residuary Body (Winding Up) Order 1989 (S.I. 1989/814)
 Copyright, Designs and Patents Act 1988 (Commencement No. 1) Order 1989 (S.I. 1989/816)
 A282 Trunk Road Dartford–Thurrock Approach Roads London Road (Slip Road) Order 1989 (S.I. 1989/817)
 Yorkshire Water Authority (East Ness Boreholes) Order 1989 (S.I. 1989/818)
 Plant Health (Forestry) (Great Britain) Order 1989 (S.I. 1989/823)
 British Steel Act 1988 (Government Shareholding) Order 1989 (S.I. 1989/824)
 Education (National Curriculum) (Modern Foreign Languages) Order 1989 (S.I. 1989/825)
 Health and Medicines Act 1988 (Commencement No. 4) Order 1989 (S.I. 1989/826)
 Pensions (Miscellaneous Offices) (Requisite Benefits) (Amendment) Order 1989 (S.I. 1989/829)
 Royal Botanic Garden, Edinburgh Regulations 1989 (S.I. 1989/830)
 National Health Service (General Dental Services) Amendment (No. 2) Regulations 1989 (S.I. 1989/832)
 Bure Valley Railway Light Railway Order 1989 (S.I. 1989/835)
 Tetrachloroethylene in Olive Oil (Scotland) Regulations 1989 (S.I. 1989/837)
 Building Societies (Provision of Services) Order 1989 (S.I. 1989/839)
 Health and Safety at Work etc. Act 1974 (Application outside Great Britain) Order 1989 (S.I. 1989/840)
 Antarctic Treaty (Amendment) Order 1989 (S.I. 1989/841)
 British Antarctic Territory Order 1989 (S.I. 1989/842)
 Child Abduction and Custody (Parties to Conventions) (Amendment) Order 1989 (S.I. 1989/843)
 Consular Fees (Amendment) Order 1989 (S.I. 1989/844)
 Merchant Shipping (Confirmation of Legislation) (Falkland Islands) Order 1989 (S.I. 1989/845)
 Food (Northern Ireland) Order 1989 (S.I. 1989/846)
 Immigration (Isle of Man) (Variation) Order 1989 (S.I. 1989/847)
 London Cab Order 1989 (S.I. 1989/848)
 National Health Service (General Dental Services) (Scotland) Amendment (No.2) Regulations 1989 (S.I. 1989/851)
 Firearms (Amendment) Act 1988 (Commencement No. 2) Order 1989 (S.I. 1989/853)
 Firearms Rules 1989 (S.I. 1989/854)
 Orkney Islands Council Harbour Revision Order 1989 (S.I. 1989/860)
 Borough of Preston (Electoral Arrangements) Order 1989 (S.I. 1989/861)
 Submarine Pipe-lines (Designated Owners) (No. 12) Order 1989 (S.I. 1989/862)
 Submarine Pipe-lines (Designated Owners) (No. 13) Order 1989 (S.I. 1989/863)
 Submarine Pipe-lines (Designated Owners) (No. 14) Order 1989 (S.I. 1989/864)
 Submarine Pipe-lines (Designated Owners) (No. 15) Order 1989 (S.I. 1989/865)
 Submarine Pipe-lines (Designated Owners) (No. 16) Order 1989 (S.I. 1989/866)
 Submarine Pipe-lines (Designated Owners) (No. 17) Order 1989 (S.I. 1989/867)
 Submarine Pipe-lines (Designated Owners) (No. 18) Order 1989 (S.I. 1989/868)
 Consumer Credit (Exempt Agreements) Order 1989 (S.I. 1989/869)
 Police (Common Police Services) (Scotland) Order 1989 (S.I. 1989/870)
 Legal Aid (Functions) (No. 2) Order 1989 (S.I. 1989/871)
 Social Security (Unemployment, Sickness and Invalidity Benefit) Amendment Regulations 1989 (S.I. 1989/872)
 Blyth Harbour Revision Order 1989 (S.I. 1989/874)
 Yarmouth (Isle of Wight) Harbour Revision Order 1989 (S.I. 1989/875)
 Emulsifiers and Stabilisers in Food Regulations 1989 (S.I. 1989/876)
 Tuberculosis (Deer) Order 1989 (S.I. 1989/878)
 Movement of Animals (Records) (Amendment) Order 1989 (S.I. 1989/879)
 Stock Transfer (Gilt-edged Securities) (Exempt Transfer) Regulations 1989 (S.I. 1989/880)
 County Court (Forms) (Amendment) Rules 1989 (S.I. 1989/886)
 Offshore Installations (Safety Zones) (No. 2) Order 1989 (S.I. 1989/887)
 Smoke Control Areas (Exempted Fireplaces) (Scotland) Order 1989 (S.I. 1989/888)
 Firearms (Scotland) Rules 1989 (S.I. 1989/889)
 Parliamentary and other Pensions Act 1987 (Commencement No. 2) Order 1989 (S.I. 1989/892)
 Social Security Miscellaneous Provisions Regulations 1989 (S.I. 1989/893)
 Police (Amendment) Regulations 1989 (S.I. 1989/895)
 Folkestone-Honiton Trunk Road (A27) (Windhover Roundabout to Southampton City Boundary and Park Gate Link Detrunking) Order 1989 (S.I. 1989/897)
 Patents (Fees) Rules 1989 (S.I. 1989/899)
 Birmingham Assay Office Order 1989 (S.I. 1989/900)

901–1000

 Education (Modification of Enactments Relating to Employment) Order 1989 (S.I. 1989/901)
 Poultry Laying Flocks (Collection and Handling of Eggs and Control of Vermin) Order 1989 (S.I. 1989/902)
 Trade Marks and Service Marks (Fees) Rules 1989 (S.I. 1989/903)
 Education (School Teachers' Pay and Conditions) Order 1989 (S.I. 1989/904)
 Wildlife and Countryside Act 1981 (Variation of Schedule) Order 1989 (S.I. 1989/906)
 Education (National Curriculum) (Attainment Targets and Programmes of Study in English) Order 1989 (S.I. 1989/907)
 Income Tax (Interest Relief) (Qualifying Lenders) Order 1989 (S.I. 1989/908)
 Register of Sasines (Microcopies) (Scotland) Regulations 1989 (S.I. 1989/909)
 Tetrachloroethylene in Olive Oil Regulations 1989 (S.I. 1989/910)
 Civil Courts (Amendment No. 3) Order 1989 (S.I. 1989/914)
 Wine and Made-wine of a Strength exceeding 1.2 per cent. and not exceeding 5.5 per cent. (Prohibition of Fortification) Regulations 1989 (S.I. 1989/916)
 Undersized Velvet Crabs Order 1989 (S.I. 1989/919)
 Motor Vehicles (Tests) (Amendment) (No. 2) Regulations 1989 (S.I. 1989/920)
 Financial Services (Disclosure of Information) (Designated Authorities) (No.5) Order 1989 (S.I. 1989/940)
 Wireless Telegraphy Apparatus (Citizens' Band European Users) (Exemption) Regulations 1989 (S.I. 1989/943)
 Capital Gains Tax (Gilt-edged Securities) Order 1989 (S.I. 1989/944)
 Emulsifiers and Stabilisers in Food (Scotland) Regulations 1989 (S.I. 1989/945)
 Teachers' Superannuation (Additional Voluntary Contributions) Regulations 1989 (S.I. 1989/946)
 Boards for Special Hospitals (Abolition) Order 1989 (S.I. 1989/947)
 Special Hospitals Service Authority (Establishment and Constitution) Order 1989 (S.I. 1989/948)
 Special Hospitals Service Authority (Functions and Membership) Regulations 1989 (S.I. 1989/949)
 European Economic Interest Grouping (Fees) Regulations 1989 (S.I. 1989/950)
 Local Land Charges (Amendment) Rules 1989 (S.I. 1989/951)
 Education (School Curriculum and Related Information) Regulations 1989 (S.I. 1989/954)
 Copyright, Designs and Patents Act 1988 (Commencement No. 2) Order 1989 (S.I. 1989/955)
 Home Purchase Assistance (Recognised Lending Institutions) Order 1989 (S.I. 1989/956)
 Mortgage Indemnities (Recognised Bodies) Order 1989 (S.I. 1989/957)
 Housing (Right to Buy) (Priority of Charges) Order 1989 (S.I. 1989/958)
 Value Added Tax (Cars) (Amendment) Order 1989 (S.I. 1989/959)
 Local Government Superannuation (Scotland) Amendment (No.2) Regulations 1989 (S.I. 1989/967)
 Erskine Bridge Tolls Order 1989 (S.I. 1989/968)
 Medicines (Products Other Than Veterinary Drugs) (General Sale List) Amendment Order 1989 (S.I. 1989/969)
 Magistrates' Courts (Remands in Custody) Order 1989 (S.I. 1989/970)
 Offshore Installations (Safety Representatives and Safety Committees) Regulations 1989 (S.I. 1989/971)
 Housing Benefit (Community Charge Rebates) (Scotland) Amendment (No. 2) Regulations 1989 (S.I. 1989/972)
 Kidderminster–Halesowen Principal Road (A456) Trunking Order 1989 (S.I. 1989/973)
 Local Government Reorganisation (Merseyside County Archives etc.) Order 1989 (S.I. 1989/974)
 Valuation Timetable (Scotland) Amendment Order 1989 (S.I. 1989/976)
 Industrial Training Levy (Clothing and Allied Products) Order 1989 (S.I. 1989/977)
 Offshore Installations (Included Apparatus or Works) Order 1989 (S.I. 1989/978)
 Transfer of Functions (Rag Flock and Other Filling Materials) Order 1989 (S.I. 1989/979)
 Child Abduction and Custody (Parties to Conventions) (Amendment) (No.2) Order 1989 (S.I. 1989/980)
 Copyright, Designs and Patents Act 1988 (Isle of Man) Order 1989 (S.I. 1989/981)
 Registered Designs Act 1949 (Isle of Man) Order 1989 (S.I. 1989/982)
 Criminal Justice Act 1988 (Torture) (Isle of Man) Order 1989 (S.I. 1989/983)
 Financial Provisions (Northern Ireland) Order 1989 (S.I. 1989/984)
 Summer Time Order 1989 (S.I. 1989/985)
 Double Taxation Relief (Taxes on Estates of Deceased Persons and Inheritances and on Gifts) (Sweden) Order 1989 (S.I. 1989/986)
 Reciprocal Enforcement of Foreign Judgments (Canada) (Amendment) Order 1989 (S.I. 1989/987)
 Copyright (Application to Other Countries) Order 1989 (S.I. 1989/988)
 Copyright (International Organisations) Order 1989 (S.I. 1989/989)
 Design Right (Reciprocal Protection) Order 1989 (S.I. 1989/990)
 Performances (Reciprocal Protection) (Convention Countries) Order 1989 (S.I. 1989/991)
 Transfer of Functions (Economic Statistics) Order 1989 (S.I. 1989/992)
 Motor Vehicles (International Circulation) (Amendment) Order 1989 (S.I. 1989/993)
 Royal Air Force Terms of Service (Amendment) Regulations 1989 (S.I. 1989/994)
 European Parliamentary Elections (Returning Officers' Expenses) Regulations 1989 (S.I. 1989/995)
 European Parliamentary Elections (Returning Officers' Expenses) (Northern Ireland) Regulations 1989 (S.I. 1989/996)
 London-Penzance Trunk Road A30 (Zelah Bypass and Slip Roads) Order 1989 (S.I. 1989/997)
 Estate Duty (Interest on Unpaid Duty) Order 1989 (S.I. 1989/998)
 Estate Duty (Northern Ireland) (Interest on Unpaid Duty) Order 1989 (S.I. 1989/999)
 Income Tax (Interest on Unpaid Tax and Repayment Supplement) Order 1989 (S.I. 1989/1000)

1001–1100

 Income Tax (Official Rate of Interest on Beneficial Loans) Order 1989 (S.I. 1989/1001)
 Inheritance Tax and Capital Transfer Tax (Interest on Unpaid Tax) Order 1989 (S.I. 1989/1002)
 Stamp Duty Reserve Tax (Interest on Tax Repaid) Order 1989 (S.I. 1989/1003)
 Standard and Collective Community Charges (Scotland) Amendment Regulations 1989 (S.I. 1989/1004)
 Immigration (Variation of Leave) (Amendment) Order 1989 (S.I. 1989/1005)
 Copyright and Rights in Performances (Notice of Seizure) Order 1989 (S.I. 1989/1006)
 Copyright (Copying by Librarians and Archivists) Regulations 1989 (S.I. 1989/1009)
 Copyright (Recording for Archives of Designated Class of Broadcasts and Cable Programmes) (Designated Bodies) Order 1989 (S.I. 1989/1011)
 Copyright (Recordings of Folksongs for Archives) (Designated Bodies) Order 1989 (S.I. 1989/1012)
 Copyright (Sub-titling of Broadcasts and Cable Programmes) (Designated Body) Order 1989 (S.I. 1989/1013)
 Motor Vehicles (Designation of Approval Marks) (Amendment) Regulations 1989 (S.I. 1989/1014)
 Plant Health (Great Britain) (Amendment) (No. 2) Order 1989 (S.I. 1989/1016)
 Housing Benefit (General) Amendment No. 3 Regulations 1989 (S.I. 1989/1017)
 Act of Sederunt (Fees of Sheriff Officers) 1989 (S.I. 1989/1018)
 Act of Sederunt (Fees of Messengers-at-Arms) 1989 (S.I. 1989/1019)
 Act of Adjournal (Consolidation Amendment No.2) (Forms of Warrant for Execution and Charge for Payment of Fine or Other Financial Penalty) 1989 (S.I. 1989/1020)
 Matrimonial Causes (Costs) (Amendment No. 2) Rules 1989 (S.I. 1989/1021)
 National Maritime Museum Act 1989 (Commencement) Order 1989 (S.I. 1989/1028)
 Offshore Installations (Emergency Pipe-line Valve) Regulations 1989 (S.I. 1989/1029 – (guidance notes in support of SI 1989/1029 issued Nov 1990))
 Pensions (Miscellaneous Offices) (Preservation of Benefits) (Amendment) Order 1989 (S.I. 1989/1030)
 Copyright, Designs and Patents Act 1988 (Commencement No. 3) Order 1989 (S.I. 1989/1032)
 Family Credit and Income Support (General) Amendment Regulations 1989 (S.I. 1989/1034)
 Self-Propelled Industrial Trucks (EEC Requirements) (Amendment) Regulations 1989 (S.I. 1989/1035)
 Health and Safety (Training for Employment) (Amendment) Regulations 1989 (S.I. 1989/1039)
 Education (Inner London Education Authority) (Continuity and Offers of Employment) Order 1989 (S.I. 1989/1040)
 Set-Aside (Amendment) Regulations 1989 (S.I. 1989/1042)
 Merger Reference (Coats Viyella plc and Tootal Group plc) Order 1989 (S.I. 1989/1054)
 Lerwick Harbour Revision Order 1989 (S.I. 1989/1055)
 Medicines (Veterinary Drugs) (Pharmacy and Merchants' List) Order 1989 (S.I. 1989/1056)
 Community Charges (Miscellaneous Provisions) Regulations 1989 (S.I. 1989/1057)
 Non-Domestic Rating (Collection and Enforcement) (Local Lists) Regulations 1989 (S.I. 1989/1058)
 Non-Domestic Rating (Discretionary Relief) Regulations 1989 (S.I. 1989/1059)
 Non-Domestic Rating (Miscellaneous Provisions) Regulations 1989 (S.I. 1989/1060)
 Unichem Limited (Allotment of Shares) Order 1989 (S.I. 1989/1061)
 Public Service Vehicles (Registration of Local Services) (Amendment) Regulations 1989 (S.I. 1989/1064)
 Unitary Development Plans (West Yorkshire) (Appointed Day) Order 1989 (S.I. 1989/1065)
 Sandeels Licensing Order 1989 (S.I. 1989/1066)
 Copyright (Application of Provisions relating to Educational Establishments to Teachers) (No. 2) Order 1989 (S.I. 1989/1067)
 Copyright (Educational Establishments) (No. 2) Order 1989 (S.I. 1989/1068)
 Copyright (Copying by Librarians and Archivists) (Amendment) Regulations 1989 (S.I. 1989/1069)
 Copyright (Industrial Process and Excluded Articles)(No. 2) Order 1989 (S.I. 1989/1070)
 Public Telecommunication System Designation (East Lancashire Cablevision Limited) Order 1989 (S.I. 1989/1076)
 Petty Sessional Divisions (Harrow) Order 1989 (S.I. 1989/1077)
 Inheritance Tax (Delivery of Accounts) Regulations 1989 (S.I. 1989/1078)
 Inheritance Tax (Delivery of Accounts) (Scotland) Regulations 1989 (S.I. 1989/1079)
 Inheritance Tax (Delivery of Accounts) (Northern Ireland) Regulations 1989 (S.I. 1989/1080)
 Restrictive Trade Practices (Sale and Purchase and Share Subscription Agreements) (Goods) Order 1989 (S.I. 1989/1081)
 Restrictive Trade Practices (Services) (Amendment) Order 1989 (S.I. 1989/1082)
 Building Societies Act 1986 (Commencement No. 2) Order 1989 (S.I. 1989/1083)
 Home-Grown Cereals Authority (Rate of Levy) Order 1989 (S.I. 1989/1084)
 Criminal Justice Act 1988 (Commencement No. 8) Order 1989 (S.I. 1989/1085)
 Road Traffic Act 1988 (Appointed Day for Section 15) Order 1989 (S.I. 1989/1086)
 Town and Country Planning (Determination of Appeals by Appointed Persons)(Amendment) Regulations 1989 (S.I. 1989/1087)
 Customs Duties (ECSC) (Amendment No. 4) Order 1989 (S.I. 1989/1088)
 Unitary Development Plans (Greater London and Dudley) (Appointed Day) Order 1989 (S.I. 1989/1089)
 Elected Authorities (Northern Ireland) Act 1989 (Commencement No. 1) Order 1989 (S.I. 1989/1093)
 Roads (Scotland) Act 1984 (Commencement No.2) Order 1989 (S.I. 1989/1094)
 Road Humps (Scotland) Regulations 1989 (S.I. 1989/1095)
 Northern Ireland Act 1974 (Interim Period Extension) Order 1989 (S.I. 1989/1096)
 Outer Space Act 1986 (Commencement) Order 1989 (S.I. 1989/1097)
 Copyright (Material Open to Public Inspection) (International Organisations) Order 1989 (S.I. 1989/1098)
 Copyright (Material Open to Public Inspection) (Marking of Copies of Maps) Order 1989 (S.I. 1989/1099)
 Design Right (Semiconductor Topographies) Regulations 1989 (S.I. 1989/1100)

1101–1200

 London Government Reorganisation (Property) Order 1989 (S.I. 1989/1101)
 Criminal Appeal (Amendment) Rules 1989 (S.I. 1989/1102)
 Crown Court (Amendment) (No. 2) Rules 1989 (S.I. 1989/1103)
 Registered Designs Rules 1989 (S.I. 1989/1105)
 Boston Fishery Orders (Continuation) Order 1989 (S.I. 1989/1106)
 Prosecution of Offences (Custody Time Limits) (Amendment) (No. 2) Regulations 1989 (S.I. 1989/1107)
 Dock Work (Compensation Payments Scheme) Regulations 1989 (S.I. 1989/1111)
 Students' Allowances (Scotland) Amendment Regulations 1989 (S.I. 1989/1112)
 Education Authority Bursaries (Scotland) Amendment Regulations 1989 (S.I. 1989/1113)
 Value Added Tax (Water) Order 1989 (S.I. 1989/1114)
 Personal Pension Schemes (Transfer Payments) (Amendment) Regulations 1989 (S.I. 1989/1115)
 Patents (Amendment) Rules 1989 (S.I. 1989/1116)
 Trade Marks and Service Marks (Amendment) Rules 1989 (S.I. 1989/1117)
 Building (Amendment of Prescribed Fees) Regulations 1989 (S.I. 1989/1118)
 Building Regulations (Amendment) Regulations 1989 (S.I. 1989/1119)
 Local Authorities' Traffic Orders (Procedure) (England and Wales) Regulations 1989 (S.I. 1989/1120)
 Consumer Credit (Advertisements) Regulations 1989 (S.I. 1989/1125)
 Consumer Credit (Quotations) Regulations 1989 (S.I. 1989/1126)
 Construction Plant and Equipment (Harmonization of Noise Emission Standards) (Amendment) Regulations 1989 (S.I. 1989/1127)
 Consumer Credit Act 1974 (Commencement No. 10) Order 1989 (S.I. 1989/1128)
 Copyright Tribunal Rules 1989 (S.I. 1989/1129)
 Design Right (Proceedings before Comptroller) Rules 1989 (S.I. 1989/1130)
 Registered Designs (Fees) Rules 1989 (S.I. 1989/1131)
 Value Added Tax (General) (Amendment) Regulations 1989 (S.I. 1989/1132)
 Education (Assisted Places) (Scotland) Regulations 1989 (S.I. 1989/1133)
 St Mary's Music School (Aided Places) Regulations 1989 (S.I. 1989/1134)
 Education (Inner London Education Authority) (Transitional and Supplementary Provisions) (No. 2) Order 1989 (S.I. 1989/1135)
 Education (School Curriculum and Related Information) (Amendment) Regulations 1989 (S.I. 1989/1136)
 Education (Reorganisation in Inner London) (Compensation) Regulations 1989 (S.I. 1989/1139)
 Non-Contentious Probate Fees (Amendment) Order 1989 (S.I. 1989/1140)
 Health and Safety (Miscellaneous Modifications) Regulations 1989 (S.I. 1989/1141)
 Water Act 1989 (Commencement No. 1) Order 1989 (S.I. 1989/1146)
 Water Supply (Water Quality) Regulations 1989 S.I. 1989/1147)
 Surface Waters (Classification) Regulations 1989 (S.I. 1989/1148)
 Controlled Waters (Lakes and Ponds) Order 1989 (S.I. 1989/1149)
 Control of Pollution (Revocations) Regulations 1989 (S.I. 1989/1150)
 Control of Pollution (Consents for Discharges etc.) (Secretary of State Functions) Regulations 1989 (S.I. 1989/1151)
 Water and Sewerage (Conservation, Access and Recreation) (Code of Practice) Order 1989 (S.I. 1989/1152)
 Director General of Water Services' Register (Inspection and Charges) Order 1989 (S.I. 1989/1154)
 Water Reorganisation (Pensions etc.) (Designated Persons) Order 1989 (S.I. 1989/1155)
 Trade Effluents (Prescribed Processes and Substances) Regulations 1989 (S.I. 1989/1156)
 Control of Pollution (Discharges by the National Rivers Authority) Regulations 1989 (S.I. 1989/1157)
 Control of Pollution (Radioactive Waste) Regulations 1989 (S.I. 1989/1158)
 Water Supply and Sewerage Services (Customer Service Standards) Regulations 1989 (S.I. 1989/1159)
 Control of Pollution (Registers) Regulations 1989 (S.I. 1989/1160)
 Water Reorganisation (Pensions etc.) Regulations 1989 (S.I. 1989/1161)
 Water Appointment (Monopolies and Mergers Commission) Regulations 1989 (S.I. 1989/1162)
 Public Telecommunication System Designation (Andover Cablevision Limited) Order 1989 (S.I. 1989/1163)
 Merchant Shipping (Accident Investigation)Regulations 1989 (S.I. 1989/1172)
 Agricultural Wages Committees (Cleveland, Durham, Northumberland and Tyne and Wear) Order 1989 (S.I. 1989/1173)
 Health and Medicines Act 1988 (Commencement No. 5) Order 1989 (S.I. 1989/1174)
 National Health Service (General Ophthalmic Services) Amendment (No. 2) Regulations 1989 (S.I. 1989/1175)
 Sight Testing (Examination and Prescription) Regulations 1989 (S.I. 1989/1176)
 National Health Service (General Ophthalmic Services) (Scotland) Amendment (No.2) Regulations 1989 (S.I. 1989/1177)
 Copyright (Customs) Regulations 1989 (S.I. 1989/1178)
 Town and Country Planning (Cardiff Bay Urban Development Area) Special Development Order 1989 (S.I. 1989/1180)
 Education (National Curriculum) (Temporary Exceptions for Individual Pupils) Regulations 1989 (S.I. 1989/1181)
 Police (Grant) (Amendment) Order 1989 (S.I. 1989/1182)
 Medicines (Data Sheet and Labelling) Amendment Regulations 1989 (S.I. 1989/1183)
 Medicines (Exemption from Licences) (Special and Transitional Cases) Amendment Order 1989 (S.I. 1989/1184)
 International Carriage of Perishable Foodstuffs (Amendment) Regulations 1989 (S.I. 1989/1185)
 Reservoirs (Panels of Civil Engineers) (Reappointment) Regulations 1989 (S.I. 1989/1186)
 Fisheries Act 1981 (Amendment) Regulations 1989 (S.I. 1989/1190)
 Hospital Complaints Procedure Act 1985 (Commencement) Order 1989 (S.I. 1989/1191)
 A6 London–Inverness Trunk Road (Barton Seagrave to West of Kettering) Detrunking Order 1989 (S.I. 1989/1197)
 A6 London–Inverness Trunk Road (Kettering Southern Bypass Slip Roads) Order 1989 (S.I. 1989/1198)
 Cereals Marketing Act (Application to Oilseeds) Order 1989 (S.I. 1989/1200)

1201–1300

 Redundant Mineworkers and Concessionary Coal (Payments Schemes) (Amendment) Order 1989 (S.I. 1989/1201)
 Patents (Licences of Right) (Exception of Pesticidal Use) Order 1989 (S.I. 1989/1202)
 Social Security (Industrial Injuries) (Prescribed Diseases) Amendment Regulations 1989 (S.I. 1989/1207)
 Act of Sederunt (Registration Appeal Court) 1989 (S.I. 1989/1208)
 Copyright (Librarians and Archivists) (Copying of Copyright Material) Regulations 1989 (S.I. 1989/1212)
 Berkshire, Dorset and Wiltshire (County Boundaries) Order 1989 (S.I. 1989/1213)
 Lotteries (Variation of Monetary Limits) (Scotland) Order 1989 (S.I. 1989/1214)
 South West Water Authority (Whitford Bridge Treatment Works) Order 1989 (S.I. 1989/1215)
 Value Added Tax (Refund of Tax) Order 1989 (S.I. 1989/1217)
 Lotteries (Variation of Monetary Limits) Order 1989 (S.I. 1989/1218)
 Motor Vehicles (Wearing of Seat Belts by Children in Rear Seats) Regulations 1989 (S.I. 1989/1219)
 Recovery Vehicles (Number of Vehicles Recovered)Order 1989 (S.I. 1989/1226)
 Recovery Vehicles (Number of Vehicles Recovered) Order (Northern Ireland) 1989 (S.I. 1989/1227)
 Air Navigation (Restriction of Flying) (Molesworth Aerodrome) (Revocation) Regulations 1989 (S.I. 1989/1228)
 Health and Medicines Act 1988 (Commencement No. 6) Order 1989 (S.I. 1989/1229)
 Sight Testing (Examination and Prescription) (No. 2) Regulations 1989 (S.I. 1989/1230)
 Warrington and Runcorn Development Corporation (Transfer of Property and Dissolution) Order 1989 (S.I. 1989/1231)
 Telecommunications Act 1984 (Extension of Relevant Period) (No. 2) Order 1989 (S.I. 1989/1232)
 Education (Abolition of Corporal Punishment) (Independent Schools) (Amendment) Regulations 1989 (S.I. 1989/1233)
 Rate Support Grant (Scotland) Order 1989 (S.I. 1989/1234)
 Education (Assisted Places) Regulations 1989 (S.I. 1989/1235)
 Education (Grants) (Music and Ballet Schools) Regulations 1989 (S.I. 1989/1236)
 Education (Assisted Places) (Incidental Expenses) Regulations 1989 (S.I. 1989/1237)
 Social Security Act 1989 (Commencement No. 1) Order 1989 (S.I. 1989/1238)
 Occupational Pension Schemes (Transitional Provisions and Savings) Regulations 1989 (S.I. 1989/1239)
 Monopolies and Mergers Commission (Increase in Membership) Order 1989 (S.I. 1989/1240)
 Ecclesiastical Judges and Legal Officers (Fees) Order 1989 (S.I. 1989/1242)
 Faculty Jurisdiction (Amendment) Rules 1989 (S.I. 1989/1243)
 Legal Officers (Annual Fees) Order 1989 (S.I. 1989/1244)
 Parochial Fees Order 1989 (S.I. 1989/1245)
 Housing Action Trust Areas (Tenant Notification)Regulations 1989 (S.I. 1989/1246)
 Road Traffic Act 1988 (Appointed Day for Section 15) (No. 2) Order 1989 (S.I. 1989/1260)
 Education (School Records) Regulations 1989 (S.I. 1989/1261)
 Social Security Act 1989 (Commencement No. 2) Order 1989 (S.I. 1989/1262)
 Sludge (Use in Agriculture) Regulations 1989 (S.I. 1989/1263)
 Buckinghamshire County Council Fenny Stratford Southern Bypass (Canal Bridge) Scheme 1987 Confirmation Instrument 1989 (S.I. 1989/1264)
 Export of Goods (Control) (Amendment No.4) Order 1989 (S.I. 1989/1270)
 Toys (Safety) Regulations 1989 (S.I. 1989/1275)
 Banks (Administration Proceedings) Order 1989 (S.I. 1989/1276)
 Education (School Premises) (Amendment) Regulations 1989 (S.I. 1989/1277)
 Scholarships and Other Benefits (Amendment) Regulations 1989 (S.I. 1989/1278)
 Food Protection (Emergency Prohibitions) (Wales) (No. 5) Amendment No. 3 Order 1989 (S.I. 1989/1279)
 Education (Inner London Education Authority) Schools Designation Order 1989 (S.I. 1989/1280)
 Food Protection (Emergency Prohibitions) Amendment (No.2) Order 1989 (S.I. 1989/1281)
 Gipsy Encampments (Borough of Runnymede) Order 1989 (S.I. 1989/1282)
 Food Protection (Emergency Prohibitions) (England) Amendment No. 3 Order 1989 (S.I. 1989/1283)
 Sea Fish (Specified Sea Area) (Regulation of Nets and Prohibition of Fishing Methods) Order 1989 (S.I. 1989/1284)
 Undersized Bass Order 1989 (S.I. 1989/1285)
 Education (Grant-maintained Schools) (Finance) Regulations 1989 (S.I. 1989/1287)
 Education (Pre-Scheme Financial Statements) (Amendment) Regulations 1989 (S.I. 1989/1288)
 Income Tax (Employments) (No. 18) Regulations 1989 (S.I. 1989/1289)
 Income Tax (Sub-Contractors in the Construction Industry) (Amendment) Regulations 1989 (S.I. 1989/1290)
 Food Imitations (Safety) Regulations 1989 (S.I. 1989/1291)
 Copyright, Designs and Patents Act 1988 (Isle of Man) (No. 2) Order 1989 (S.I. 1989/1292)
 Copyright (Application to Other Countries) (No. 2) Order 1989 (S.I. 1989/1293)
 Design Right (Reciprocal Protection) (No.  2) Order 1989 (S.I. 1989/1294)
 Cod (Specified Sea Areas) (Prohibition of Fishing) (No. 3) Order 1989 (S.I. 1989/1295)
 Performances (Reciprocal Protection) (Convention Countries) (No. 2) Order 1989 (S.I. 1989/1296)
 Taxes (Interest Rate) Regulations 1989 (S.I. 1989/1297)
 Finance Act 1989, section 178(1), (Appointed Day No. 1) Order 1989 (S.I. 1989/1298)
 Income Tax (Stock Lending) Regulations 1989 (S.I. 1989/1299)
 Recovery of Tax in Summary Proceedings (Financial Limits) Order 1989 (S.I. 1989/1300)

1301–1400

 Stamp Duty Reserve Tax (Amendment) Regulations 1989 (S.I. 1989/1301)
 Value Added Tax (General) (Amendment) (No. 2) Regulations 1989 (S.I. 1989/1302)
 Copyright, Designs and Patents Act 1988 (Commencement No. 4) Order 1989 (S.I. 1989/1303)
 Representation of the People (Northern Ireland) (Amendment) Regulations 1989 (S.I. 1989/1304)
 Merseyside Development Corporation (Vesting of Land) (General) Order 1989 (S.I. 1989/1305)
 Outer Space Act 1986 (Fees) Regulations 1989 (S.I. 1989/1306)
 Rules of the Supreme Court (Amendment No. 3) 1989 (S.I. 1989/1307)
 Education (National Curriculum) (Exceptions) (Wales) Regulations 1989 (S.I. 1989/1308)
 Import and Export (Plant Health Fees) (England and Wales) (Amendment) Order 1989 (S.I. 1989/1309)
 Beet Seeds (Amendment) Regulations 1989 (S.I. 1989/1310)
 Cereal Seeds (Amendment) Regulations 1989 (S.I. 1989/1311)
 Fodder Plant Seeds (Amendment) Regulations 1989 (S.I. 1989/1312)
 Oil and Fibre Plant Seeds (Amendment) Regulations 1989 (S.I. 1989/1313)
 Seeds (National Lists of Varieties) (Amendment) Regulations 1989 (S.I. 1989/1314)
 Vegetable Seeds (Amendment) Regulations 1989 (S.I. 1989/1315)
 Tuberculosis (Deer) Notice of Intended Slaughter and Compensation Order 1989 (S.I. 1989/1316)
 Atomic Energy Act 1989 (Commencement) Order 1989 (S.I. 1989/1317)
 Representation of the People Act 1989 (Commencement No.1) Order 1989 (S.I. 1989/1318)
 Education (Teachers) Regulations 1989 (S.I. 1989/1319)
 Community Charge Benefits (General) Regulations 1989 (S.I. 1989/1321)
 Community Charge Benefits (Transitional) Order 1989 (S.I. 1989/1322)
 Income Support (General) Amendment No. 2 Regulations 1989 (S.I. 1989/1323)
 Social Security (Unemployment, Sickness and Invalidity Benefit) Amendment No. 2 Regulations 1989 (S.I. 1989/1324)
 Guarantee Payments (Exemption) (No. 24) Order 1989 (S.I. 1989/1326)
 European Communities (Designation) Order 1989 (S.I. 1989/1327)
 Army, Air Force and Naval Discipline Acts (Continuation) Order 1989 (S.I. 1989/1328)
 Visiting Forces (Designation) Order 1989 (S.I. 1989/1329)
 Visiting Forces and International Headquarters (Application of Law) (Amendment) Order 1989 (S.I. 1989/1330)
 British Nationality (Pakistan) Order 1989 (S.I. 1989/1331)
 Child Abduction and Custody (Parties to Conventions) (Amendment) (No. 3) Order 1989 (S.I. 1989/1332)
 Gibraltar Supreme Court (Admiralty Practice) (Amendment) Rules Order 1989 (S.I. 1989/1333)
 Merchant Shipping Act 1988 (Bermuda) Order 1989 (S.I. 1989/1334)
 Home Guard (Amendment) Order 1989 (S.I. 1989/1335)
 Appropriation (No. 2)(Northern Ireland) Order 1989 (S.I. 1989/1336)
 Appropriation (No. 3)(Northern Ireland) Order 1989 (S.I. 1989/1337)
 Firearms (Amendment) (Northern Ireland) Order 1989 (S.I. 1989/1338)
 Limitation (Northern Ireland) Order 1989 (S.I. 1989/1339)
 Misuse of Drugs Act 1971 (Modification) Order 1989 (S.I. 1989/1340)
 Police and Criminal Evidence (Northern Ireland) Order 1989 S.I. 1989/1341)
 Social Security(Northern Ireland) Order 1989 (S.I. 1989/1342)
 Solicitors (Amendment)(Northern Ireland) Order 1989 (S.I. 1989/1343)
 Treatment of Offenders (Northern Ireland) Order 1989 (S.I. 1989/1344)
 Community Service Orders (Northern Ireland Consequential Amendments) Order 1989 (S.I. 1989/1345)
 Civil Jurisdiction and Judgments Act 1982 (Amendment) Order 1989 (S.I. 1989/1346)
 Registration of Title Order 1989 (S.I. 1989/1347)
 Arbitration (Foreign Awards) Order 1989 (S.I. 1989/1348)
 Air Navigation (Fifth Amendment) Order 1989 (S.I. 1989/1349)
 Hovercraft (Application of Enactments) Order 1989 (S.I. 1989/1350)
 Hovercraft (General) (Amendment) Order 1989 (S.I. 1989/1351)
 Education (Financial Delegation to Schools) (Mandatory Exceptions) Regulations 1989 (S.I. 1989/1352)
 Cider and Perry Regulations 1989 (S.I. 1989/1355)
 Wine and Made-wine Regulations 1989 (S.I. 1989/1356)
 Bingo Duty (Exemptions) Order 1989 (S.I. 1989/1357)
 Pool Betting Duty (Exemptions) Order 1989 (S.I. 1989/1358)
 Greater Manchester Residuary Body (Winding Up) Order 1989 (S.I. 1989/1359)
 National Health Service (General Medical and Pharmaceutical Services) Amendment Regulations 1989 (S.I. 1989/1360)
 Prevention of Terrorism (Temporary Provisions) Act 1989 (Commencement No. 1) Order 1989 (S.I. 1989/1361)
 Social Security (Attendance Allowance)Amendment Regulations 1989 (S.I. 1989/1362)
 Annual Close Time (Lossie Salmon Fishery District) Order 1989 (S.I. 1989/1363)
 Central Regional Council (The Stirlingshire and Falkirk Water Order 1957 Amendment) Water Order 1989 (S.I. 1989/1364)
 Scottish Land Court (Fees) Order 1989 (S.I. 1989/1365)
 Scottish Land Court Order 1989 (S.I. 1989/1366)
 Scottish Land Court Amendment Rules 1989 (S.I. 1989/1367)
 Excise Duties (Deferred Payment) (Amendment) Regulations 1989 (S.I. 1989/1368)
 Electricity Act 1989 (Commencement No.1) Order 1989 (S.I. 1989/1369)
 Electricity Supply (Scientists) Superannuation Scheme (Winding Up) Regulations 1989 (S.I. 1989/1370)
 Community Charges (Cross-Border Information) Regulations 1989 (S.I. 1989/1371)
 Motor Cars (Driving Instruction) (Amendment) Regulations 1989 (S.I. 1989/1373)
 Recovery Vehicles (Prescribed Purposes) Regulations 1989 (S.I. 1989/1376)
 Recovery Vehicles (Prescribed Purposes) Regulations (Northern Ireland) 1989 (S.I. 1989/1377)
 Rivers (Prevention of Pollution) Act 1951 (Continuation of Byelaws) Order 1989 (S.I. 1989/1378)
 Water and Sewerage (Works) (Advance Payments) Regulations 1989 (S.I. 1989/1379)
 Water (Local Statutory Provisions) (Consequential Amendments) Order 1989 (S.I. 1989/1380)
 Water Reorganisation (Pensions etc.) (Amendment) Regulations 1989 (S.I. 1989/1381)
 Water Reorganisation (Pensions etc.) (Designated Persons) (Amendment) Order 1989 (S.I. 1989/1382)
 Water Supply and Sewerage Services (Customer Service Standards) (Amendment) Regulations 1989 (S.I. 1989/1383)
 Water Supply (Water Quality) (Amendment) Regulations 1989 (S.I. 1989/1384)
 (A6) London–Inverness Trunk Road (Quorn–Mountsorrel Bypass and Slip Roads) Order 1989 (S.I. 1989/1387)
 (A6) London–Inverness Trunk Road (Quorn–Mountsorrel Bypass De-Trunking) Order 1989 (S.I. 1989/1388)
 Black Country Development Corporation (Vesting of Land) (Borough of Walsall) Order 1989 Approved by both Houses of ParliamentS.I. 1989/1389)
 Black Country Development Corporation (Vesting of Land) (General) Order 1989 (S.I. 1989/1390)
 London Docklands Development Corporation (Vesting of Land) (Port of London Authority and London Borough of Newham) Order 1989 (S.I. 1989/1391)
 London Docklands Development Corporation (Vesting of Land) (Thames Water Authority) Order 1989 (S.I. 1989/1392)
 Merseyside Development Corporation (Vesting of Land) (Transport Land) Order 1989Approved by both Houses of ParliamentS.I. 1989/1393)
 Sheffield Development Corporation (Vesting of Land) (British Railways Board) Order 1989 (S.I. 1989/1394)
 Black Country Development Corporation (Vesting of Land) (British Railways Board) Order 1989 (S.I. 1989/1395)
 Black Country Development Corporation (Vesting of Land) (Central Electricity Generating Board) Order 1989 (S.I. 1989/1396)
 Sandwell Borough Council (Holloway Bank Canal Bridge) Scheme 1988 Confirmation Instrument 1989 (S.I. 1989/1397)
 West of Maidenhead–Oxford Trunk Road (Crowmarsh Hill Realignment) Order 1989 (S.I. 1989/1398)
 Local Government Reorganisation (Property, etc.) (West Midlands) Order 1989 (S.I. 1989/1399)
 Agricultural Holdings (Units of Production) Order 1989 (S.I. 1989/1400)

1401–1500

 Fire Precautions (Sub-surface Railway Stations) Regulations 1989 (S.I. 1989/1401)
 Dartford–Thurrock Crossing Tolls Order 1989 (S.I. 1989/1402)
 Leeds Development Corporation (Vesting of Land) (British Railways Board) Order 1989 Approved by both Houses of ParliamentS.I. 1989/1403)
 Leeds Development Corporation (Vesting of Land) (General) Order 1989 (S.I. 1989/1404)
 Tyne and Wear Development Corporation (Vesting of Land) (Port of Tyne Authority and British Railways Board) Order 1989 (S.I. 1989/1405)
 Tyne and Wear Development Corporation (Vesting of Land) (Various Local Authorities) Order 1989 (S.I. 1989/1406)
 Port of Tyne (Pilotage) Harbour Revision Order 1989 (S.I. 1989/1407)
 Severn-Trent Water Authority (Bradmer Hill and Budby Boreholes) Order 1989 (S.I. 1989/1419)
 Rent Officers (Additional Functions) (Amendment) Order 1989 (S.I. 1989/1430)
 London-Brighton Trunk Road (A23 Dale Hill Slip Roads) (No 2) Order 1989 (S.I. 1989/1431)
 London — Brighton Trunk Road (A23 Hickstead Slip Roads) (No 2) Order 1989 (S.I. 1989/1432)
 London–Brighton Trunk Road (A23 Warninglid Flyover–South of Bolney Slip Roads) Order 1989 (S.I. 1989/1433)
 London-Brighton Trunk Road (Bolney De-Trunking) Order 1989 (S.I. 1989/1434)
 Levens Bridge to Carlisle Trunk Road (A595 Egremont Bypass) (Detrunking) Order 1989 (S.I. 1989/1435)
 Levens Bridge to Carlisle Trunk Road (A595 Egremont Bypass) Order 1989 (S.I. 1989/1436)
 Authorised Unit Trust Scheme (Investment and Borrowing Powers) (Amendment) Regulations 1989 (S.I. 1989/1437)
 Air Navigation (Restriction of Flying) (Gruinard Island) (Revocation) Regulations 1989 (S.I. 1989/1438)
 Levens Bridge–Carlisle Trunk Road (A596 Wigton Bypass) (Detrunking) Order 1989 (S.I. 1989/1439)
 Levens Bridge–Carlisle Trunk Road (A596 Wigton Bypass) Order 1989 (S.I. 1989/1440)
 Rent Officers (Additional Functions) (Scotland) Amendment Order 1989 (S.I. 1989/1446)
 Education (Bursaries for Teacher Training) (Amendment) Regulations 1989 (S.I. 1989/1451)
 Education (Further and Higher Education Funding Schemes) (Publication and Information) Regulations 1989 (S.I. 1989/1452)
 Education (School Teachers' Pay and Conditions) (Amendment) Order 1989 (S.I. 1989/1453)
 Nurses, Midwives and Health Visitors (Parts of the Register) Amendment (No. 2) Order 1989 (S.I. 1989/1455)
 Nurses, Midwives and Health Visitors (Registered Fever Nurses Amendment Rules and Training Amendment Rules) Approval Order 1989 (S.I. 1989/1456)
 Reporting of Injuries, Diseases and Dangerous Occurrences (Amendment) Regulations 1989 (S.I. 1989/1457)
 Education (Mandatory Awards) Regulations 1989 (S.I. 1989/1458)
 Industrial Training Levy (Road Transport) Order 1989 (S.I. 1989/1459)
 Misuse of Drugs (Amendment) Regulations 1989 (S.I. 1989/1460)
 Companies Act 1985 (Modifications for Statutory Water Companies) Regulations 1989 (S.I. 1989/1461)
 Local Government Superannuation (Water) Regulations 1989 (S.I. 1989/1462)
 Colyton Grammar School (Designation of Staff) Order 1989 (S.I. 1989/1463)
 Water Authorities (Successor Companies) Order 1989 (S.I. 1989/1465)
 Education (Adult Education Centres Funding Schemes) Regulations 1989 (S.I. 1989/1468)
 Education (Grant-maintained Schools) (Publication of Proposals) Regulations 1989 (S.I. 1989/1469)
 Education (Proposed Further and Higher Education Institutions) Regulations 1989 (S.I. 1989/1470)
 A23 Trunk Road (Brighton Road, Croydon) (Prescribed Routes) Order 1989 (S.I. 1989/1471)
 Social Security (Contribution Conditions for Unemployment and Sickness Benefit) Transitional Regulations 1989 (S.I. 1989/1472)
 Car Tax (Amendment) Regulations 1989 (S.I. 1989/1473)
 Standard and Collective Community Charges (Scotland) Amendment (No.2) Regulations 1989 (S.I. 1989/1476)
 Abolition of Domestic Rates (Domestic and Part Residential Subjects) (No.2) (Scotland) Regulations 1989 (S.I. 1989/1477)
 Road Vehicles (Construction and Use) (Amendment) Regulations 1989 (S.I. 1989/1478)
 Aerodromes (Designation) (Facilities for Consultation) Order 1989 (S.I. 1989/1489)
 Civil Legal Aid (Scotland) (Fees) Regulations 1989 (S.I. 1989/1490)
 Criminal Legal Aid (Scotland) (Fees) Regulations 1989 (S.I. 1989/1491)
 Advice and Assistance (Scotland) Amendment (No.2) Regulations 1989 (S.I. 1989/1492)
 Legal Advice and Assistance (Scotland) Amendment Regulations 1989 (S.I. 1989/1493)
 Legal Aid (Scotland) (Fees in Criminal Proceedings) Amendment (No.2) Regulations 1989 (S.I. 1989/1494)
 Legal Aid (Scotland) (Fees in Civil Proceedings) Amendment (No.2) Regulations 1989 (S.I. 1989/1495)
 Central Regional Council (Denny and Dunipace Water Supply Confirmation Act 1888) Repeal Order 1989 (S.I. 1989/1498)
 Annual Close Time (River Dee (Aberdeenshire) Salmon Fishery District) Order 1989 (S.I. 1989/1499)
 River Dee (Aberdeenshire) Salmon Fishery District (Baits and Lures) Regulations 1989 (S.I. 1989/1500)

1501–1600

 Northern Ireland (Emergency Provisions) Act 1978 (Amendment) Order 1989 (S.I. 1989/1501)
 Anglian Water Authority (Rushbrooke Borehole) Order 1989 (S.I. 1989/1502)
 Education (School Government) Regulations 1989 (S.I. 1989/1503)
 Levens Bridge–Carlisle Trunk Road (A595 Hensingham Bypass) (Detrunking) Order 1989 (S.I. 1989/1504)
 Levens Bridge – Carlisle Trunk Road (A595 Hensingham Bypass) Order 1989 (S.I. 1989/1505)
 Finance Act 1989 (Savings-Related Share Option Schemes) (Appointed Day) Order 1989 (S.I. 1989/1520)
 Savings Certificates (Yearly Plan) (Amendment) Regulations 1989 (S.I. 1989/1521)
 London–Edinburgh–Thurso Trunk Road (Bramham Moor to Grange Moor and Slip Roads) Order 1989 (S.I. 1989/1525)
 A2 and the A205 Trunk Roads (Rochester Way and Westhorne Avenue Detrunking)Order 1989 (S.I. 1989/1526)
 Water Authorities (Transfer of Functions) (Appointed Day) Order 1989 (S.I. 1989/1530)
 Water Reorganisation (Holding Companies of Successor Companies) Order 1989 (S.I. 1989/1531)
 Water Reorganisation (Successor Companies) (Transfer of Loans) Order 1989 (S.I. 1989/1532)
 Financial Services (Authorised Unit Trust Scheme) (Certificate of Compliance) Regulations 1989 (S.I. 1989/1535)
 Education (Teachers) (Amendment) (No. 2) Regulations 1989 (S.I. 1989/1541)
 Harwich Dock Company Harbour Empowerment Order 1988S.I. 1989/1545)
 Essex (District Boundaries) Order 1989 (S.I. 1989/1546)
 Landlord and Tenant Act 1954, Part II (Notices) (Amendment) Regulations 1989 (S.I. 1989/1548)
 A1079 Trunk Road (Market Weighton Bypass) Order 1989 (S.I. 1989/1549)
 A1079 Trunk Road (York Road to Weighton Hill) (Detrunking) Order 1989 (S.I. 1989/1550)
 Diseases of Animals (Approved Disinfectants) (Amendment) (No. 2) Order 1989 (S.I. 1989/1555)
 A35 Trunk Road (Yellowham Hill, Troy Town Improvement) Order 1989 (S.I. 1989/1556)
 Water Act 1989 (Commencement No. 2 and Transitional Provisions) Order 1989 (S.I. 1989/1557)
 Merger Reference (Blue Circle Industries plc and Myson Group plc) Order 1989 (S.I. 1989/1558)
 Merger Reference (Yale & Valor plc and Myson Group plc) Order 1989 (S.I. 1989/1559)
 Water Act 1989 (Commencement No. 3) (Scotland) Order 1989 (S.I. 1989/1561)
 Submarine Pipe-lines (Designated Owners) (No. 19) Order 1989 (S.I. 1989/1562)
 Submarine Pipe-lines (Designated Owners) (No. 20) Order 1989 (S.I. 1989/1563)
 Submarine Pipe-lines (Designated Owners) (No. 21) Order 1989 (S.I. 1989/1564)
 Submarine Pipe-lines (Designated Owners) (No. 22) Order 1989 (S.I. 1989/1565)
 Submarine Pipe-lines (Designated Owners) (No. 23) Order 1989 (S.I. 1989/1566)
 Submarine Pipe-lines (Designated Owners) (No. 24) Order 1989 (S.I. 1989/1567)
 Submarine Pipe-lines (Designated Owners) (No. 25) Order 1989 (S.I. 1989/1568)
 Guarantee Payments (Exemption) (No. 25) Order 1989 (S.I. 1989/1575)
 Sea Fishing (Enforcement of Community Conservation Measures) (Amendment) (No. 2) Order 1989 (S.I. 1989/1576)
 Motor Vehicles (Type Approval) (Amendment) Regulations 1989 (S.I. 1989/1578)
 Motor Vehicles (Type Approval for Goods Vehicles) (Great Britain) (Amendment) Regulations 1989 (S.I. 1989/1579)
 Motor Vehicles (Type Approval) (Great Britain) (Amendment) Regulations 1989 (S.I. 1989/1580)
 Financial Services Act 1986 (Commencement) (No. 12) Order 1989 (S.I. 1989/1583)
 Financial Services (Schemes Authorised in Designated Countries or Territories) (Notification) Regulations 1989 (S.I. 1989/1584)
 Financial Services (Schemes Constituted in Other Member States) Regulations 1989 (S.I. 1989/1585)
 Financial Services (Recognised Collective Investment Schemes from Other Member States) (Luxembourg) Order 1988 (Revocation) Order 1989 (S.I. 1989/1586)
 Insolvency Practitioners (Amendment) Regulations 1989 (S.I. 1989/1587)
 Local Government (Direct Labour Organisations) (Competition) Regulations 1989 (S.I. 1989/1588)
 Local Government (Direct Labour Organisations) (Specified Number of Employed Persons) Order 1989 (S.I. 1989/1589)
 Town and Country Planning General Development (Amendment) (No. 2) Order 1989 (S.I. 1989/1590)
 Motorcycles (Sound Level Measurement Certificates) (Amendment) (No.2) Regulations 1989 (S.I. 1989/1591)
 Petty Sessional Divisions (Essex) Order 1989 (S.I. 1989/1592)
 Criminal Justice Act 1988 (Commencement No. 9) Order 1989 (S.I. 1989/1595)
 Magistrates' Courts (Backing of Warrants) (Amendment) Rules 1989 (S.I. 1989/1596)
 Magistrates' Courts (Extradition) Rules 1989 (S.I. 1989/1597)
 A6(M) Motorway (Stockport North–South Bypass) and Connecting Roads Scheme 1989 (S.I. 1989/1598)
 A6 Trunk Road (Hazel Grove Diversion) Order 1989 (S.I. 1989/1599)
 A6 Trunk Road Hazel Grove (Detrunking) Order 1989 (S.I. 1989/1600)

1601–1700

 A523 Trunk Road (Hazel Grove Diversion) Order 1989 (S.I. 1989/1601)
 A523 Trunk Road Hazel Grove (Detrunking) Order 1989 (S.I. 1989/1602)
 Customs Duties (ECSC) (Amendment No. 5) Order 1989 (S.I. 1989/1610)
 Special Hospitals Service Authority (Functions and Membership) Amendment Regulations 1989 (S.I. 1989/1611)
 Motor Vehicles (Driving Licences) (Amendment) (No. 3) Regulations 1989 (S.I. 1989/1612)
 Hovercraft (Fees) Regulations 1989 (S.I. 1989/1613)
 Anglian Water Authority (East Watton Borehole) Order 1989 (S.I. 1989/1614)
 Severn-Trent Water Authority (Nether Padley) Mains Order 1989 (S.I. 1989/1615)
 A47 Trunk Road (East Norton Bypass) Order 1989 (S.I. 1989/1619)
 Welsh Water Authority (Abergele Chest Hospital Waterworks) Order 1989 (S.I. 1989/1620)
 Welsh Water Authority (Parc to Glanrhyd Hospital Water Supply) Order 1989 (S.I. 1989/1621)
 Welsh Water Authority (Pendine Water Supply) Order 1989 (S.I. 1989/1622)
 Welsh Water Authority (North Wales Hospital, Denbigh, Waterworks) Order 1989 (S.I. 1989/1623)
 Local Government Superannuation (Valuation and Community Charge Tribunals) Regulations 1989 (S.I. 1989/1624)
 Bodmin Railway Centre Light Railway Order 1989 (S.I. 1989/1625)
 Income Support (Transitional) Amendment Regulations 1989 (S.I. 1989/1626)
 Social Security (Credits) Amendment Regulations 1989 (S.I. 1989/1627)
 Assured and Protected Tenancies (Lettings to Students) (Amendment) Regulations 1989 (S.I. 1989/1628)
 National Health Service (General Dental Services) Amendment (No. 3) Regulations 1989 (S.I. 1989/1629)
 National Health Service (Service Committees and Tribunal) Amendment Regulations 1989 (S.I. 1989/1630)
 Personal and Occupational Pension Schemes (Miscellaneous Amendments) (No. 2) Regulations 1989 (S.I. 1989/1641)
 Social Security (Abolition of Earnings Rule) (Consequential) Regulations 1989 (S.I. 1989/1642)
 Gipsy Encampments (Borough of Oadby and Wigston) Order 1989 (S.I. 1989/1647)
 Gipsy Encampments (District of Blaby) Order 1989 (S.I. 1989/1648)
 A33 Trunk Road (Chilcomb Link) Detrunking Order 1989 (S.I. 1989/1649)
 A33 Trunk Road (Popham–Kingsworthy) Detrunking Order 1989 (S.I. 1989/1650)
 Cardiff-Glan Conwy Trunk Road (A470) The Newtown-Aberystwyth Trunk Road (A44) (Trunk Roads and Junction Improvements, Llangurig) Order 1989 (S.I. 1989/1661)
 Motor Vehicles (Authorisation of Special Types) (Amendment) Order 1989 (S.I. 1989/1662)
 A406 Trunk Road (North Circular Road, Brent) (Prescribed Routes) Order 1989 (S.I. 1989/1665)
 Offshore Installations and Pipeline Works (First-Aid) Regulations 1989 (S.I. 1989/1671)
 Offshore Installations (Operational Safety, Health and Welfare and Life-Saving Appliances) (Revocations) Regulations 1989 (S.I. 1989/1672)
 Firearms (Amendment) Act 1988 (Commencement No. 2) Order (Amendment) Order 1989 (S.I. 1989/1673)
 Superannuation (Valuation and Community Charge Tribunals) Order 1989 (S.I. 1989/1674)
 Orkney Islands Council (Loch of Boardhouse) (Amendment) Water Order 1989 (S.I. 1989/1676)
 Social Security (Contributions) (Transitional and Consequential Provisions) Regulations 1989 (S.I. 1989/1677)
 Income Support (General) Amendment No. 3 Regulations 1989 (S.I. 1989/1678)
 Oxfordshire County Council (Oxford Canal, Bridge) Scheme 1987 Confirmation Instrument 1989 (S.I. 1989/1680)
 Social Security (Medical Evidence, Claims and Payments) Amendment Regulations 1989 (S.I. 1989/1686)
 Social Security (Severe Disablement Allowance (Amendment) and Local Councillors Consequential) Regulations 1989 (S.I. 1989/1687)
 Housing Benefit (Permitted Totals) Amendment Order 1989 (S.I. 1989/1688)
 Social Security (Adjudication) Amendment Regulations 1989 (S.I. 1989/1689)
 Social Security Benefit (Dependency and Computation of Earnings) Amendment Regulations 1989 (S.I. 1989/1690)
 A23 Trunk Road (Streatham High Road, Lambeth) (Prohibition of Right Turn) Order 1989 (S.I. 1989/1691)
 Cod (Specified Sea Areas) (Prohibition of Fishing) (No. 4) Order 1989 (S.I. 1989/1692)
 Goods Vehicles (Plating and Testing) (Amendment) (No. 2) Regulations 1989 (S.I. 1989/1693)
 Motor Vehicles (Tests) (Amendment) (No.2) Regulations 1989 (S.I. 1989/1694)
 Road Vehicles (Construction and Use) (Amendment) (No. 2) Regulations 1989 (S.I. 1989/1695)

1701–1800

 Building Societies (Liquid Asset) (Amendment) Regulations 1989 (S.I. 1989/1701)
 A12 Trunk Road (Capel St. Mary Grade-Separated Junction Slip Roads) Order 1989 (S.I. 1989/1715)
 M32 Motorway (Hambrook Interchange to Lower Ashley Road Interchange) and Connecting Roads Scheme 1989 (S.I. 1989/1716)
 Merger Reference (Atlas Copco AB and Desoutter Brothers (Holdings) plc) Order 1989 (S.I. 1989/1718)
 The Wychavon (Parishes) Order 1989 S.I. 1989/1721
 Further Education (Recoupment) (Amendment) Regulations 1989 (S.I. 1989/1722)
 A65 Trunk Road (Draughton Bypass) Order 1989 (S.I. 1989/1735)
 A65 Trunk Road (Draughton Bypass De-Trunking) Order 1989 (S.I. 1989/1736)
 Great Yarmouth Port Authority Harbour Revision Order 1989 (S.I. 1989/1737)
 Education (Publication and Consultation Etc.) (Scotland) Amendment Regulations 1989 (S.I. 1989/1739)
 Police (Amendment) (No. 2) Regulations 1989 (S.I. 1989/1745)
 Immobilisation of Vehicles Illegally Parked (London Borough of Hammersmith and Fulham) Order 1989 (S.I. 1989/1746)
 A5 Trunk Road (Shrawardine Turn) Order 1989 (S.I. 1989/1747)
 Anglian Water Authority (High Pale) Boreholes Order 1989 (S.I. 1989/1748)
 National Health Service (Superannuation) (Scotland) Amendment (No.2) Regulations 1989 (S.I. 1989/1749)
 A6 Trunk Road (Market Harborough Bypass) Order 1989 (S.I. 1989/1755)
 A6 Trunk Road (Market Harborough Bypass) Detrunking Order 1989 (S.I. 1989/1756)
 City of Manchester (M56 North Cheshire Motorway) (Bowdon to Wythenshawe Airport Link Road Section) Connecting Roads Scheme 1988 Confirmation Instrument 1989 (S.I. 1989/1757)
 Local Review Committee (Scotland) Amendment Rules 1989 (S.I. 1989/1761)
 Food Protection (Emergency Prohibitions) Amendment No. 3 Order 1989 (S.I. 1989/1764)
 Protection of Wrecks (Designation No. 1 Order 1979) (Amendment) Order 1989 (S.I. 1989/1766)
 Export of Sheep (Prohibition) (No. 2) Amendment No. 3 Order 1989 (S.I. 1989/1767)
 Food Protection (Emergency Prohibitions) (England) Amendment No. 4 Order 1989 (S.I. 1989/1768)
 Smoke Control Areas (Exempted Fireplaces) Order 1989 (S.I. 1989/1769)
 Food Protection (Emergency Prohibitions) (Wales) (No. 5) Amendment No. 4 Order 1989 (S.I. 1989/1770)
 Cambridgeshire County Council (River Nene Old Course, Bodsey Bridge Reconstruction) Scheme 1989 Confirmation Instrument 1989 (S.I. 1989/1774)
 Finance Act 1989 (Repeal of Tithe Redemption Enactments) (Appointed Day) Order 1989 (S.I. 1989/1788)
 Noise at Work Regulations 1989 (S.I. 1989/1790)
 Road Vehicles Lighting Regulations 1989 (S.I. 1989/1796)
 A134 Principal Road (Thetford to Tottenhill Trunking) Order 1989 (S.I. 1989/1797)
 Merchant Shipping (Distress Signals and Prevention of Collisions) Regulations 1989 (S.I. 1989/1798)
 London Government Reorganisation (Property etc.) (No. 2) Order 1989 (S.I. 1989/1799)
 Macduff (Pilotage Powers) Order 1989 (S.I. 1989/1800)

1801–1900

 Scottish Milk Marketing Scheme (Consolidation) Approval Order 1989 (S.I. 1989/1806)
 A6 Trunk Road (Black Lodge Improvement) Order 1989 (S.I. 1989/1807)
 A6 Trunk Road (Burton Latimer Bypass) Order 1989 (S.I. 1989/1808)
 Genetic Manipulation Regulations 1989 (S.I. 1989/1810)
 London Government Reorganisation (Pensions etc.) Order 1989 (S.I. 1989/1815)
 Building Societies (Designation of Qualifying Bodies) (Amendment) (No. 2) Order 1989 (S.I. 1989/1816)
 Building Societies (Gibraltar) Order 1989 (S.I. 1989/1817)
 Cereals Co-responsibility Levy (Amendment) (No. 2) Regulations 1989 (S.I. 1989/1823)
 Social Security (Industrial Injuries and Diseases) Miscellaneous Provisions (Amendment) Regulations 1989 (S.I. 1989/1824)
 Education (Abolition of Corporal Punishment) (Independent Schools) (Prescribed Categories of Persons) Regulations 1989 (S.I. 1989/1825)
 Civil Aviation Authority (Amendment) Regulations 1989 (S.I. 1989/1826)
 Cholsey and Wallingford Light Railway Order 1989 (S.I. 1989/1833)
 Newport–Shrewsbury Trunk Road A4042 (Malpas Interchange to Cwmbran Drive, De-Trunking) Order 1989 (S.I. 1989/1836)
 General Medical Council Professional Conduct Committee (EC Practitioners) (Procedure) Rules Order of Council 1989 (S.I. 1989/1837)
 County Court (Amendment No. 3) Rules 1989 (S.I. 1989/1838)
 Acquisition of Land (Rate of Interest after Entry) Regulations 1989 (S.I. 1989/1839)
 Acquisition of Land (Rate of Interest after Entry) (Scotland) Regulations 1989 (S.I. 1989/1840)
 Consumer Credit (Exempt Agreements) (Amendment) Order 1989 (S.I. 1989/1841)
 Wireless Telegraphy (Testing and Development Under Suppressed Radiation Conditions) (Exemption) Regulations 1989 (S.I. 1989/1842)
 Road Traffic (Driver Licensing and Information Systems) Act 1989 (Commencement No. 1) Order 1989 (S.I. 1989/1843)
 Public Service Vehicles (Temporary Driving Entitlement) Regulations 1989 (S.I. 1989/1844)
 East of Christchurch–Tredegar Park Motorway (Connecting Roads Special Roads) (Variation) Scheme 1989 (S.I. 1989/1846)
 M4/Newport-Shrewsbury Trunk Road A4042 (Relief of Brynglas Tunnels and Malpas Road) Order 1989 (S.I. 1989/1847)
 Wireless Telegraphy (Licence Charges) Regulations 1989 (S.I. 1989/1850)
 Offshore Installations (Safety Zones) (No. 3) Order 1989 (S.I. 1989/1851)
 Medicines (Prescription Only, Pharmacy and General Sale) Amendment Order 1989 (S.I. 1989/1852)
 Newtown-Aberystwyth Trunk Road (A489) (Mochdre Roundabout, Newtown) Order 1989 (S.I. 1989/1862)
 Road Vehicles (Construction and Use) (Amendment) (No. 3) Regulations 1989 (S.I. 1989/1865)
 Yorkshire Water Authority (Alteration of Boundaries of the Lower Ouse Internal Drainage District) Order 1989 (S.I. 1989/1866)
 East Lewis Salmon Fishery District Designation Order 1989 (S.I. 1989/1869)
 Ipswich–Norwich Trunk Road (A140) (Dickleburgh Bypass) Order 1989 (S.I. 1989/1871)
 Ipswich-Norwich Trunk Road (A140) (Dickleburgh Bypass) (Detrunking) Order 1989 (S.I. 1989/1872)
 Carriage of Passengers and their Luggage by Sea (United Kingdom Carriers) (Amendment) Order 1989 (S.I. 1989/1880)
 Merchant Shipping Act 1979 (Commencement No. 13) Order 1989 (S.I. 1989/1881)
 Merchant Shipping (Sterling Equivalents)(Merchant Shipping Act 1974) Order 1989 (S.I. 1989/1882)
 National Health Service (General Medical and Pharmaceutical Services) (Scotland) Amendment Regulations 1989 (S.I. 1989/1883)
 Health and Medicines Act 1988 (Superannuation) (Savings for Retired Practitioners) Regulations 1989 (S.I. 1989/1893)
 Health and Medicines Act 1988 (Commencement No.7) Order 1989 (S.I. 1989/1896)
 National Health Service (General Medical and Pharmaceutical Services) Amendment (No. 2) Regulations 1989 (S.I. 1989/1897)
 Excise Duties (Personal Reliefs) (Fuel and Lubricants Imported in Vehicles) Order 1989 (S.I. 1989/1898)

1901–2000

 Land Registration (District Registries) Order 1989 (S.I. 1989/1902)
 Health and Safety (Enforcing Authority) Regulations 1989 (S.I. 1989/1903)
 Income Tax (Reserve and Auxiliary Forces) (Amendment) Regulations 1989 (S.I. 1989/1905)
 Public Telecommunication System Designation (Cable Camden Limited) Order 1989 (S.I. 1989/1912)
 Public Telecommunication System Designation (CableVision Bedfordshire Limited) Order 1989 (S.I. 1989/1913)
 Export of Goods (Control) (Amendment No. 5) Order 1989 (S.I. 1989/1914)
 County Court (Forms) (Amendment No. 2) Rules 1989 (S.I. 1989/1918)
 Severn Bridge Tolls Order 1989 (S.I. 1989/1922)
 Highland Regional Council (Allt Bail'an Tuim Bhuidhe) Water Order 1989 (S.I. 1989/1923)
 Fair Employment (Northern Ireland) Act 1989 (Commencement) Order 1989 (S.I. 1989/1928)
 Wireless Telegraphy (Licence Charges) (Amendment) Regulations 1989 (S.I. 1989/1929)
 Income Tax (Interest Relief) (Qualifying Lenders) (No. 2) Order 1989 (S.I. 1989/1932)
 Sale of Registration Marks Regulations 1989 (S.I. 1989/1938)
 Water (Pensions and Compensation) (Transfer of Liabilities) Regulations 1989 (S.I. 1989/1939)
 Offshore Installations (Life-saving Appliances and Fire-fighting Equipment) (Amendment) Regulations 1989 (S.I. 1989/1940)
 Cowes Harbour Revision Order 1989 (S.I. 1989/1941)
 Plant Health (Forestry) (Great Britain) (Amendment) Order 1989 (S.I. 1989/1951)
 Insurance Companies (Accounts and Statements) (Amendment) Regulations 1989 (S.I. 1989/1952)
 Condensed Milk and Dried Milk (Amendment) Regulations 1989 (S.I. 1989/1959)
 Sea Fishing (Enforcement of Community Quota Measures) (Amendment) Order 1989 (S.I. 1989/1960)
 Poultry Breeding Flocks and Hatcheries (Registration and Testing) Order 1989 (S.I. 1989/1963)
 Poultry Laying Flocks (Testing and Registration etc.) Order 1989 (S.I. 1989/1964)
 Water (Consequential Amendments) Regulations 1989 (S.I. 1989/1968)
 Fishguard–Bangor Trunk Road A487 (Port Dinorwic By-Pass) Order 1989 (S.I. 1989/1969)
 Condensed Milk and Dried Milk (Scotland) Amendment Regulations 1989 (S.I. 1989/1975)
 Borough of Warrington (Electoral Arrangements) Order 1989 (S.I. 1989/1976)
 Unitary Development Plans (South Yorkshire and Hounslow) (Appointed Day) Order 1989 (S.I. 1989/1979)
 Health and Medicines Act 1988 (Commencement No.8) Order 1989 (S.I. 1989/1984)
 Medicines (Pharmacies) (Applications for Registration and Fees) Amendment Regulations 1989 (S.I. 1989/1985)
 Social Security (Industrial Injuries and Diseases) Miscellaneous Provisions (Amendment) (No. 2) Regulations 1989 (S.I. 1989/1986)
 National Health Service (General Medical and Pharmaceutical Services) (Scotland) Amendment (No.2) Regulations 1989 (S.I. 1989/1990)
 Merchant Shipping (Ministry of Defence Ships) Order 1989 (S.I. 1989/1991)
 Local Authorities (Armorial Bearings) (No. 2) Order 1989 (S.I. 1989/1992)
 Falkland Islands (Territorial Sea) Order 1989 (S.I. 1989/1993)
 St. Helena and Dependencies (Territorial Sea) Order 1989 (S.I. 1989/1994)
 South Georgia and South Sandwich Islands (Territorial Sea) Order 1989 (S.I. 1989/1995)
 Turks and Caicos Islands (Territorial Sea) Order 1989 (S.I. 1989/1996)
 Copyright, Designs and Patents Act 1988 (Guernsey) Order 1989 (S.I. 1989/1997)
 Fuel and Electricity (Control) Act 1973 (Continuation) (Jersey) Order 1989 (S.I. 1989/1998)
 Licensing and Clubs (Amendment) (Northern Ireland) Order 1989 (S.I. 1989/1999)
 Judicial Committee (Fees) Order 1989 (S.I. 1989/2000)

2001–2100

 Social Security (Isle of Man) (No. 2) Order 1989 (S.I. 1989/2001)
 Social Security (Philippines) Order 1989 (S.I. 1989/2002)
 Fraudulent Reception of Transmissions (Guernsey) Order 1989 (S.I. 1989/2003)
 Air Navigation Order 1989 (S.I. 1989/2004)
 Collision Regulations (Seaplanes) Order 1989 (S.I. 1989/2005)
 Merchant Shipping Act 1988 (Amendment) Order 1989 (S.I. 1989/2006)
 Shrewsbury–Whitchurch–Warrington Trunk Road (A49, Tarporley Road, Stretton) (Trunking) Order 1989 (S.I. 1989/2008)
 Financial Services (Disclosure of Information) (Designated Authorities) (No. 6) Order 1989 (S.I. 1989/2009)
 A406 Trunk Road (South Woodford to Barking Relief Road, Redbridge, Newham, Barking and Dagenham) (Prescribed Routes) Order 1989 (S.I. 1989/2010)
 Bristol Development Corporation (Vesting of Land) (British Railways Board) Order 1989 (S.I. 1989/2011)
 Feeding Stuffs (Amendment) Regulations 1989 (S.I. 1989/2014)
 Sea Fish Licensing Order 1989 (S.I. 1989/2015)
 Passenger and Goods Vehicles (Recording Equipment) (Approval of Fitters and Workshops) (Fees) (Amendment) Regulations 1989 (S.I. 1989/2016)
 Water Reorganisation (Capital Allowances) Order 1989 (S.I. 1989/2017)
 Water Reorganisation (Nominated Holding Companies) (Extinguishment of Loans) Order 1989 (S.I. 1989/2018)
 Renfrew and Cunninghame Districts (Caldwell House Estate) Boundaries Amendment Order 1989 (S.I. 1989/2021) (S. 140)
 Public Telecommunication System Designation (Merseyside Cablevision Limited) Order 1989 (S.I. 1989/2034)
 Public Telecommunication System Designation (Lancashire Cable Television Limited) Order 1989 (S.I. 1989/2035)
 Boston Harbour Revision Order 1989 (S.I. 1989/2036)
 Education (Areas to which Pupils and Students Belong) Regulations 1989 (S.I. 1989/2037)
 The Mid Bedfordshire (Parishes) Order 1989 S.I. 1989/2040
 National Savings Bank (Amendment) (No. 2) Regulations 1989 (S.I. 1989/2045)
 National Savings Stock Register (Amendment) (No. 2) Regulations 1989 (S.I. 1989/2046)
 Movement of Animals (Records) (Amendment) (No. 2) Order 1989 (S.I. 1989/2053)
 Education (Designated Institutions) (Amendment) Order 1989 (S.I. 1989/2055)
 Food Protection (Emergency Prohibitions) (Contamination of Feeding Stuff) (Wales) Order 1989 (S.I. 1989/2056)
 Motor Cars (Driving Instruction) Regulations 1989 (S.I. 1989/2057)
 Goods Vehicles (Authorisation of International Journeys) (Fees) (Amendment) Regulations 1989 (S.I. 1989/2058)
 London–King's Lynn Trunk Road (A10) (Brandon Creek – Southery Improvement) Order 1989 (S.I. 1989/2059)
 Food Protection (Emergency Prohibitions) (Contamination of Feeding Stuff) (England) Amendment No.2 Order 1989 (S.I. 1989/2060)
 Bovine Offal (Prohibition) Regulations 1989 (S.I. 1989/2061)
 Civil Aviation (Investigation of Air Accidents) Regulations 1989 (S.I. 1989/2062)
 Public Telecommunication System Designation (Birmingham Cable Limited) Order 1989 (S.I. 1989/2072)
 The East Lindsey (Parishes) Order 1989 S.I. 1989/2073
 Food Protection (Emergency Prohibitions) (Contamination of Feeding Stuff) (England) (No. 2) Order 1989 (S.I. 1989/2077)
 Food Protection (Emergency Prohibitions) (Contamination of Feeding Stuff) (Wales) Amendment Order 1989 (S.I. 1989/2078)
 Food Protection (Emergency Prohibitions) (Contamination of Feeding Stuff) (England) (No. 2) Amendment Order 1989 (S.I. 1989/2087)
 Food Protection (Emergency Prohibitions) (Contamination of Feeding Stuff) (England) (No. 2) Amendment No. 2 Order 1989 (S.I. 1989/2088)
 Protection of Wrecks (Designation No. 1) Order 1989 (S.I. 1989/2089)
 Chester-Bangor Trunk Road (A55) (Rhuallt Hill Improvement and Slip Roads) Order 1989 (S.I. 1989/2091)
 Food Protection (Emergency Prohibitions) (Contamination of Feeding Stuff) (Wales) (No. 2) Order 1989 (S.I. 1989/2092)
 Security Service Act 1989 (Commencement) Order 1989 (S.I. 1989/2093)
 Church Representation Rules (Amendment) (No. 1) Resolution 1989 (S.I. 1989/2094)
 Church Representation Rules (Amendment) (No. 2) Resolution 1989 (S.I. 1989/2095)
 Haddock (Specified Sea Areas) (Prohibition of Fishing) Order 1989 (S.I. 1989/2096)
 Cumbria, Northumberland and North Yorkshire (County Boundaries) Order 1989 (S.I. 1989/2097)
 Alcoholic Liquor Duties Act 1979 (Repeal of Section 31) Order 1989 (S.I. 1989/2098)
 Food Protection (Emergency Prohibitions) (Contamination of Feeding Stuff) (England) (No. 3) Order 1989 (S.I. 1989/2100)

2101–2200

 East Surrey Water (Constitution and Regulation) Order 1989 (S.I. 1989/2101)
 Housing (Right to Buy)(Priority of Charges)(No. 2) Order 1989 (S.I. 1989/2102)
 Home Purchase Assistance (Recognised Lending Institutions) (No. 2) Order 1989 (S.I. 1989/2103)
 Mortgage Indemnities (Recognised Bodies) (No. 2) Order 1989 (S.I. 1989/2104)
 Food Protection (Emergency Prohibitions) (Contamination of Feeding Stuff) (Wales) (No. 2) Amendment Order 1989 (S.I. 1989/2105)
 Human Organ Transplants Act 1989 (Commencement) Order 1989 (S.I. 1989/2106)
 Human Organ Transplants (Establishment of Relationship) Regulations 1989 (S.I. 1989/2107)
 Human Organ Transplants (Supply of Information) Regulations 1989 (S.I. 1989/2108)
 Food Protection (Emergency Prohibitions) (Contamination of Feeding Stuff) (Wales) (No. 3) Order 1989 (S.I. 1989/2109)
 Unitary Development Plans (Greater Manchester and Sunderland) (Appointed Day) Order 1989 (S.I. 1989/2114)
 The Woking (Parish of Byfleet) Order 1989 S.I. 1989/2116
 Air Navigation (Restriction of Flying) (Security Establishments in Northern Ireland) Regulations 1989 (S.I. 1989/2117)
 Air Navigation (Restriction of Flying) (High Security Prisons) Regulations 1989 (S.I. 1989/2118)
 Shrewsbury–Whitchurch–Warrington Trunk Road (A49 Weaverham Diversion, Cheshire) Order 1989 (S.I. 1989/2119)
 Shrewsbury – Whitchurch – Warrington Trunk Road A49 Trunk Road Weaverham (Detrunking) Order 1989 (S.I. 1989/2120)
 Passenger and Goods Vehicles (Recording Equipment) Regulations 1989 (S.I. 1989/2121)
 Social Security (Unemployment, Sickness and Invalidity Benefit) Amendment No. 3 Regulations 1989 (S.I. 1989/2122)
 Social Security Benefit (Computation of Earnings) Amendment Regulations 1989 (S.I. 1989/2123)
 Food Protection (Emergency Prohibitions) (Contamination of Feeding Stuff) (England) (No.3) Amendment Order 1989 (S.I. 1989/2124)
 Edinburgh City Bypass (Sighthill, Colinton, Burdiehouse, Gilmerton and Millerhill Sections and Connecting Roads) (Speed Limit) Regulations 1989 (S.I. 1989/2125)
 Rules of Procedure (Army) (Amendment) Rules 1989 (S.I. 1989/2127)
 Police and Criminal Evidence Act 1984 Codes of Practice (Armed Forces) Order 1989 (S.I. 1989/2128)
 Rules of Procedure (Air Force) (Amendment) Rules 1989 (S.I. 1989/2129)
 Standing Civilian Courts (Amendment) Order 1989 (S.I. 1989/2130)
 Meat and Meat Products (Hormonal Substances) Regulations 1989 (S.I. 1989/2133)
 Traffic Signs (Amendment) Regulations 1989 and the Traffic Signs (Amendment) General Directions 1989 (S.I. 1989/2139)
 Sex Discrimination Act 1975 (Exemption of Special Treatment for Lone Parents) Order 1989 (S.I. 1989/2140)
 Prison (Amendment) (No. 2) Rules 1989 (S.I. 1989/2141)
 Young Offender Institution (Amendment) (No. 2) Rules 1989 (S.I. 1989/2142)
 A12 Trunk Road (Colchester Road, Havering) (Prescribed Routes) Order 1989 (S.I. 1989/2143)
 Colne Valley Water Company (Pipelaying and Other Works) (Code of Practice) Order 1989 (S.I. 1989/2144)
 Design Right (Semiconductor Topographies) (Amendment) Regulations 1989 (S.I. 1989/2147)
 Meat and Meat Products (Hormonal Substances) (Scotland) Regulations 1989 (S.I. 1989/2157)
 Revenue Support Grant (Specified Bodies) Regulations 1989 (S.I. 1989/2161)
 Guarantee Payments (Exemption) (No. 26) Order 1989 (S.I. 1989/2163)
 Insider Dealing (Public Servants) Order 1989 (S.I. 1989/2164)
 Insider Dealing (Recognised Stock Exchange) Order 1989 (S.I. 1989/2165)
 Commons Registration (General) (Amendment) Regulations 1989 (S.I. 1989/2167)
 Food Protection (Emergency Prohibitions) (Contamination of Feeding Stuff) (England) (No.3) Amendment No.2 Order 1989 (S.I. 1989/2168)
 Pressure Systems and Transportable Gas Containers Regulations 1989 (S.I. 1989/2169)
 Insolvency Practitioners (Amendment) (No.2) Regulations 1989 (S.I. 1989/2170)
 Local Government and Housing Act 1989 (Commencement No.1) Order 1989 (S.I. 1989/2180)
 Food Protection (Emergency Prohibitions) (Contamination of Feeding Stuff) (Wales) (No. 3) Amendment Order 1989 (S.I. 1989/2181)
 Public Telecommunication System Designation (East London Telecommunications Limited) Order 1989 (S.I. 1989/2182)
 Goods Vehicles (Operators' Licences) (Temporary Use in Great Britain) (Amendment) Regulations 1989 (S.I. 1989/2183)
 Goods Vehicles (Authorisation of International Journeys) (Fees) (Amendment) (No.2) Regulations 1989 (S.I. 1989/2184)
 Local Government and Housing Act 1989 (Commencement No. 2) Order 1989 (S.I. 1989/2186)
 A11 Trunk Road (Red Lodge Bypass and Slip Roads) Order 1989 (S.I. 1989/2187)
 Public Lending Right Scheme 1982 (Commencement of Variations) Order 1989 (S.I. 1989/2188)
 County Council of Suffolk (Mutford Bridges) Scheme 1989 Confirmation Instrument 1989 (S.I. 1989/2189)
 Gaming Act (Variation of Monetary Limits) (No. 2) Order 1989 (S.I. 1989/2190)
 County Council of Avon (M32 Motorway (Hambrook Interchange to Lower Ashley Road Interchange) and Connecting Roads) (Revocation) Scheme 1989 Confirmation Instrument 1989 (S.I. 1989/2191)
 Wirral Metropolitan Borough Council M53 Motorway (Moreton Spur Extension to Upton Bypass) Scheme 1988 Confirmation Instrument 1989 (S.I. 1989/2192)
 Food Protection (Emergency Prohibitions) (Contamination of Feeding Stuff) (England) (No. 3) Amendment No. 3 Order 1989 (S.I. 1989/2193)
 Pyramid Selling Schemes Regulations 1989 (S.I. 1989/2195)
 Import and Export (Plant Health Fees) (Scotland) Order 1989 (S.I. 1989/2196)

2201–2300

 Town and Country Planning (Central Manchester Urban Development Area) Special Development Order 1989 (S.I. 1989/2203)
 Town and Country Planning (Sheffield Urban Development Area) Special Development Order 1989 (S.I. 1989/2204)
 Town and Country Planning (Bristol Urban Development Area) Special Development Order 1989 (S.I. 1989/2205)
 Town and Country Planning (Leeds Urban Development Area) Special Development Order 1989 (S.I. 1989/2206)
 Classification, Packaging and Labelling of Dangerous Substances (Amendment) Regulations 1989 (S.I. 1989/2208)
 Construction (Head Protection) Regulations 1989 (S.I. 1989/2209)
 Suppression of Terrorism Act 1978 (Designation of Countries) Order 1989 (S.I. 1989/2210)
 Gipsy Encampments (Metropolitan District of Doncaster) Order 1989 (S.I. 1989/2211)
 Preservatives in Food (Scotland) Amendment Regulations 1989 (S.I. 1989/2216)
 Taunton – Fraddon Trunk Road A361 (Landkey Link) (Detrunking) Order 1989 (S.I. 1989/2218)
 Industrial Training Levy (Hotel and Catering) Order 1989 (S.I. 1989/2219)
 Civil Aviation (Canadian Navigation Services) (Second Amendment) Regulations 1989 (S.I. 1989/2220)
 Civil Aviation (Joint Financing) (Amendment) Regulations 1989 (S.I. 1989/2221)
 Police (Scotland) Amendment Regulations 1989 (S.I. 1989/2222)
 Local Statutory Provisions (Postponement of Repeal) (Scotland) Order 1989 (S.I. 1989/2223)
 Cosmetic Products (Safety) Regulations 1989 (S.I. 1989/2233)
 Personal Community Charge (Exemption for the Severely Mentally Impaired) (Scotland) Regulations 1989 (S.I. 1989/2234)
 Combined Probation Areas (West Sussex) (No.2) Order 1989 (S.I. 1989/2238)
 Food Protection (Emergency Prohibitions) (Contamination of Feeding Stuff) (England) (No. 4) Order 1989 (S.I. 1989/2239)
 Combined Probation Areas (Lancashire) Order 1989 (S.I. 1989/2240)
 Combined Probation Areas (Warwickshire) Order 1989 (S.I. 1989/2241)
 Education (Higher Education Corporations) (No. 6) Order 1989 (S.I. 1989/2242)
 Local Government Act 1988 (Defined Activities) (Exemption) (England) Order 1989 (S.I. 1989/2243)
 Value Added Tax (Accounting and Records) Regulations 1989 (S.I. 1989/2248)
 Gaming Act (Variation of Monetary Limits) (Scotland) (No.2) Order 1989 (S.I. 1989/2249)
 Public Health (Notification of Infectious Diseases) (Scotland) Amendment Regulations 1989 (S.I. 1989/2250)
 Plant Health (Great Britain) (Amendment) (No. 3) Order 1989 (S.I. 1989/2251)
 Customs Duty (Personal Reliefs) (Amendment) Order 1989 (S.I. 1989/2252)
 Excise Duties (Small Non-Commercial Consignments) Relief (Amendment) Regulations 1989 (S.I. 1989/2253)
 Gaming Machine Licence Duty (Variation of Monetary Limits and Exemptions) Order 1989 (S.I. 1989/2254)
 Value Added Tax (Bad Debt Relief) (Amendment) Regulations 1989 (S.I. 1989/2255)
 Value Added Tax (General) (Amendment) (No. 3) Regulations 1989 (S.I. 1989/2256)
 Civil Aviation (Route Charges for Navigation Services) (Amendment) Regulations 1989 (S.I. 1989/2257)
 Supply of Beer (Loan Ties, Licensed Premises and Wholesale Prices) Order 1989 (S.I. 1989/2258)
 Value Added Tax (Do-It-Yourself Builders) (Refund of Tax) Regulations 1989 (S.I. 1989/2259)
 Non-Domestic Rating (Collection and Enforcement) (Central Lists) Regulations 1989 (S.I. 1989/2260)
 Non-Domestic Rating (Unoccupied Property) Regulations 1989 (S.I. 1989/2261)
 Motor Vehicles (Type Approval) (Amendment) (No.2) Regulations 1989 (S.I. 1989/2262)
 Central Rating Lists Regulations 1989 (S.I. 1989/2263)
 A47 Leicester—Great Yarmouth Trunk Road (Easton-Postwick), A11 London—Norwich Trunk Road (Cringleford—Mile End Road), A140 Ipswich—Norwich Trunk Road (South of Norwich Road—Daniels Road) (Norwich Southern Bypass) Detrunking Order 1989 (S.I. 1989/2264)
 A47 Leicester-Great Yarmouth Trunk Road (Norwich Southern Bypass and Slip Roads) (Southern and Eastern Section) Order 1989 (S.I. 1989/2265)
 A47 Leicester-Great Yarmouth Trunk Road (Norwich Southern Bypass) (River Yare Bridge) Order 1989 (S.I. 1989/2266)
 Occupational Pensions (Revaluation) Order 1989 (S.I. 1989/2267)
 Charging Authorities (Population for Precepts) (Wales) Regulations 1989 (S.I. 1989/2268)
 Food Protection (Emergency Prohibitions) (Contamination of Feeding Stuff) (Wales) (No. 4) Order 1989 (S.I. 1989/2269)
 Finance Act 1985 (Serious Misdeclaration and Interest on Tax) (Appointed Days) Order 1989 (S.I. 1989/2270)
 Finance Act 1989 (Recovery of Overpaid Tax and Administration) (Appointed Days) Order 1989 (S.I. 1989/2271)
 Value Added Tax (Finance, Health and Welfare) Order 1989 (S.I. 1989/2272)
 Value Added Tax (Small Non-Commercial Consignments) Relief (Amendment) Order 1989 (S.I. 1989/2273)
 Community Charges (Miscellaneous Provisions) (No. 2) Regulations 1989 (S.I. 1989/2274)
 Agricultural or Forestry Tractors and Tractor Components (Type Approval) (Amendment) Regulations 1989 (S.I. 1989/2275)
 Apple and Pear Development Council (Dissolution) Order 1989 (S.I. 1989/2276)
 Apple and Pear Research Council Order 1989 (S.I. 1989/2277)
 Water Act 1989 (Commencement No.4) Order 1989 (S.I. 1989/2278)
 Lancashire County Council (Improvement of Eanam/Higher Eanam, Blackburn – New Eanam Canal Bridge) Scheme 1987 Confirmation Instrument 1989 (S.I. 1989/2279)
 Surface Waters (Dangerous Substances) (Classification) Regulations 1989 (S.I. 1989/2286)
 Preservatives in Food (Amendment) Regulations 1989 (S.I. 1989/2287)
 All-Terrain Motor Vehicles (Safety) Regulations 1989 (S.I. 1989/2288)
 Pension Scheme Surpluses (Valuation) (Amendment) Regulations 1989 (S.I. 1989/2290)
 Borough of Tonbridge and Malling (Electoral Arrangements) Order 1989 (S.I. 1989/2291)
 County Councils (Library Authority Expenses) (Wales) Order 1989 (S.I. 1989/2292)
 Transport Act 1985 (Extension of Eligibility for Travel Concessions) (Amendment) Order 1989 (S.I. 1989/2293)
 Protection of Wrecks (Designation No.2) Order 1989 (S.I. 1989/2294)
 Protection of Wrecks (Designation No. 3) Order 1989 (S.I. 1989/2295)

2301–2400

 Animals (Scientific Procedures) Act (Fees) Order 1989 (S.I. 1989/2302)
 Non-Domestic Rating (Miscellaneous Provisions) (No. 2) Regulations 1989 (S.I. 1989/2303)
 Non-Domestic Ratepayers (Consultation) Regulations 1989 (S.I. 1989/2304)
 Charging Authorities (Notification of Precept Population) (Wales) Regulations 1989 (S.I. 1989/2305)
 Animals (Scientific Procedures) Act 1986 (Commencement No. 2) Order 1989 (S.I. 1989/2306)
 Inshore Fishing (Prohibition of Fishing and Fishing Methods) (Scotland) Order 1989 (S.I. 1989/2307)
 Teaching Council (Scotland) Election Scheme 1989 Approval Order 1989 (S.I. 1989/2308)
 Housing Revenue Account General Fund Contribution Limits (Scotland) Order 1989 (S.I. 1989/2310)
 Employment Act 1989 (Amendments and Revocations) Order 1989 (S.I. 1989/2311)
 Offices, Shops and Railway Premises Act 1963 (Commencement No. 3) Order 1989 (S.I. 1989/2312)
 Suppression of Terrorism Act 1978 (Application of Provisions) (Republic of Ireland) Order 1989 (S.I. 1989/2313)
 Reservoirs Act 1975 (Application Fees) (Amendment) Regulations 1989 (S.I. 1989/2314)
 A5/A49 Trunk Roads (Shrewsbury Bypass and Improvements) (Temporary Bridge over the River Severn at Uffington, Shrewsbury) Order 1989 (S.I. 1989/2315)
 (AS) London-Holyhead Trunk Road and Slip Roads and the (A49) Newport-Shrewsbury-Whitchurch-Warrington Trunk Road (A5/A49 Shrewsbury By-Pass and Improvements) Order 1985 (Emstrey Amendment) Order 1989 (S.I. 1989/2316)
 (A5) London–Holyhead Trunk Road and Slip Roads and the (A49) Newport–Shrewsbury–Whitchurch– Warrington Trunk Road (A5/A49 Shrewsbury By-Pass and Improvements) Order 1985 (Sutton Hall Amendment) Order 1989 (S.I. 1989/2317)
 Medicines (Veterinary Drugs) (Pharmacy and Merchants' List) (No. 2) Order 1989 (S.I. 1989/2318)
 Medicines (Veterinary Drugs) (Prescription Only) Order 1989 (S.I. 1989/2319)
 Medicines (Medicated Animal Feeding Stuffs) Regulations 1989 (S.I. 1989/2320)
 Caseins and Caseinates (Amendment) Regulations 1989 (S.I. 1989/2321)
 Medicines (Exemption from Licences) (Wholesale Dealing) Order 1989 (S.I. 1989/2322)
 Medicines (Exemption from Licences) (Special and Transitional Cases) (Amendment) Order 1989 (S.I. 1989/2323)
 Medicines (Animal Feeding Stuffs) (Enforcement) (Amendment) Regulations 1989 (S.I. 1989/2324)
 Medicines (Exemptions from Licences) (Intermediate Medicated Feeding Stuffs) Order 1989 (S.I. 1989/2325)
 Bovine Spongiform Encephalopathy (No. 2) Amendment Order 1989 (S.I. 1989/2326)
 Export of Goods (Control) (Amendment No. 6) Order 1989 (S.I. 1989/2327)
 Home Purchase Assistance (Recognised Lending Institutions) (No. 3) Order 1989 (S.I. 1989/2328)
 Housing (Right to Buy) (Priority of Charges) (No. 3) Order 1989 (S.I. 1989/2329)
 Mortgage Indemnities (Recognised Bodies) (No. 3) Order 1989 (S.I. 1989/2330)
 Non-Domestic Rating (Stud Farms) Order 1989 (S.I. 1989/2331)
 A3 Trunk Road (Roehampton Vale, Wandsworth) (Speed Limits) Order 1989 (S.I. 1989/2332)
 Education (Publication of Schemes for Financing Schools) Regulations 1989 (S.I. 1989/2335)
 Collection Fund (England) Regulations 1989 (S.I. 1989/2336)
 Consumer Credit (Exempt Agreements) (Amendment) (No.2) Order 1989 (S.I. 1989/2337)
 Income Tax (Reduced and Composite Rate) Order 1989 (S.I. 1989/2339)
 Income Support (Transitional) Amendment No. 2 Regulations 1989 (S.I. 1989/2340)
 Channel Tunnel Act (Competition) Order 1989 (S.I. 1989/2345)
 Oral Snuff (Safety) Regulations 1989 (S.I. 1989/2347)
 A34 Winchester-Preston Trunk Road (North of Oxford to Monkspath) De-Trunking Order 1989 (S.I. 1989/2348)
 A41 London–Birmingham Trunk Road (Bicester to South of Knowle) De-Trunking Order 1989 (S.I. 1989/2349)
 A43 Oxford—Market Deeping Trunk Road (Weston-on-the-Green to South of Baynard's Green) De-Trunking Order 1989 (S.I. 1989/2350)
 A423 North of Oxford–South of Coventry Trunk Road (Kidlington to East Adderbury) De-Trunking Order 1989 (S.I. 1989/2351)
 Essex and Suffolk (County Boundaries) Order 1989 (S.I. 1989/2352)
 Value Added Tax (General) (Amendment) (No.4) Regulations 1989 (S.I. 1989/2355)
 Furniture and Furnishings (Fire) (Safety) (Amendment) Regulations 1989 (S.I. 1989/2358)
 Public Service Vehicles (Conditions of Fitness, Equipment, Use and Certification) (Amendment) Regulations 1989 (S.I. 1989/2359)
 Road Vehicles (Construction and Use) (Amendment) (No. 4) Regulations 1989 (S.I. 1989/2360)
 Valuation (Stud Farms) (Scotland) Order 1989 (S.I. 1989/2361)
 Community Water Charges (Scotland) Amendment Regulations 1989 (S.I. 1989/2362)
 Collection Fund (Wales) Regulations 1989 (S.I. 1989/2363)
 Commonwealth Development Corporation (Additional Enterprises) (Variation) Order 1989 (S.I. 1989/2364)
 Public Telecommunication System Designation (West Country Cable Limited) Order 1989 (S.I. 1989/2365)
 Teachers' Pay and Conditions Act 1987 (Continuation) Order 1989 (S.I. 1989/2366)
 Health and Safety (Fees) (Amendment) Regulations 1989 (S.I. 1989/2367)
 Marriage Fees (Scotland) Regulations 1989 (S.I. 1989/2368)
 Health and Medicines Act 1988 (Superannuation) (Savings for Retired Practitioners) (Scotland) Regulations 1989 (S.I. 1989/2369)
 Registration of Births, Deaths and Marriages (Fees) (Scotland) Order 1989 (S.I. 1989/2370)
 Registration of Births, Deaths, Marriages and Divorces (Fees) (Scotland) Regulations 1989 (S.I. 1989/2371)
 Dartford–Thurrock Crossing Regulations 1989 (S.I. 1989/2372)
 Export of Goods (Control) Order 1989 (S.I. 1989/2376)
 Sutton District Water Company (Constitution and Regulation) Order 1989 (S.I. 1989/2379)
 Financial Services (Designated Countries and Territories) (Overseas Insurance Companies) Order 1989 (S.I. 1989/2380)
 A12 LondonGreat Yarmouth Trunk Road (Gorleston Relief Road and Slip Roads) Order 1989 (S.I. 1989/2381)
 Milk and Dairies (Semi-skimmed and Skimmed Milk) (Heat Treatment and Labelling) (Amendment) Regulations 1989 (S.I. 1989/2382)
 Milk (Special Designation) Regulations 1989 (S.I. 1989/2383)
 Foreign Fields (Specification) Order 1989 (S.I. 1989/2384)
 Valuation Roll and Valuation Notice (Scotland) Order 1989 (S.I. 1989/2385)
 Valuation Timetable (Scotland) Order 1989 (S.I. 1989/2386)
 Private Medical Insurance (Tax Relief) Regulations 1989 (S.I. 1989/2387)
 Social Fund Cold Weather Payments (General) Amendment Regulations 1989 (S.I. 1989/2388)
 Private Medical Insurance (Disentitlement to Tax Relief and Approved Benefits) Regulations 1989 Laid before the House of CommonsS.I. 1989/2389)
 Supply of Beer (Tied Estate) Order 1989 (S.I. 1989/2390)
 European Communities (Designation) (No. 2) Order 1989 (S.I. 1989/2393)
 Exempt Charities Order 1989 (S.I. 1989/2394)
 Air Navigation (Overseas Territories) Order 1989 (S.I. 1989/2395)
 Brunei (Appeals) Order 1989 (S.I. 1989/2396)
 Cayman Islands (Territorial Sea) Order 1989 (S.I. 1989/2397)
 Continental Shelf (Designation of Areas) Order 1989 (S.I. 1989/2398)
 Falkland Islands Courts (Overseas Jurisdiction) Order 1989 (S.I. 1989/2399)
 Merchant Shipping Act 1979 (Overseas Territories) Order 1989 (S.I. 1989/2400)

2401–2500

 Montserrat Constitution Order 1989 (S.I. 1989/2401)
 Appropriation (No. 4)(Northern Ireland) Order 1989 (S.I. 1989/2402)
 Broadcasting Act 1981 (Isle of Man) Order 1989 (S.I. 1989/2403)
 Companies (Northern Ireland) Order 1989 (S.I. 1989/2404)
 Insolvency (Northern Ireland) Order 1989 (S.I. 1989/2405)
 Education Reform(Northern Ireland) Order 1989 (S.I. 1989/2406)
 Fishery Limits Act 1976 (Guernsey) Order 1989 (S.I. 1989/2407)
 Human Organ Transplants (Northern Ireland) Order 1989 (S.I. 1989/2408)
 Insolvency Act 1986 (Guernsey) Order 1989 (S.I. 1989/2409)
 Merchant Shipping (Distress Signals and Prevention of Collisions) (Guernsey) Order 1989 (S.I. 1989/2410)
 Sea Fish (Conservation) (Channel Islands) (Amendment) Order 1989 (S.I. 1989/2411)
 Sea Fisheries (Channel Islands) (Amendment) Order 1989 (S.I. 1989/2412)
 Youth Service (Northern Ireland) Order 1989 (S.I. 1989/2413)
 King George's Fund for Sailors (Amendment of Charter) Order 1989 (S.I. 1989/2414)
 Copyright (Application to Other Countries) (No. 2) (Amendment) Order 1989 (S.I. 1989/2415)
 Ministerial and other Salaries Order 1989 (S.I. 1989/2416)
 Friendly Societies (Modification of the Corporation Tax Acts) Regulations 1989 (S.I. 1989/2417)
 Education (Higher Education Corporations) (No. 7) Order 1989 (S.I. 1989/2418)
 Borough of Colchester (Electoral Arrangements) Order 1989 (S.I. 1989/2419)
 Sex Discrimination Act 1975 (Exemption of Police Federation Constitutional and Electoral Arrangements) Order 1989 (S.I. 1989/2420)
 Customs Duties (ECSC) (Quota and Other Reliefs) Order 1989 (S.I. 1989/2421)
 River Hamble Harbour Revision Order 1989 (S.I. 1989/2422)
 Credit Unions (Increase in Limits of Shareholding, of Deposits by persons too young to be members and of Loans) Order 1989 (S.I. 1989/2423)
 Community Charges (Notification of Deaths) Regulations 1989 (S.I. 1989/2424)
 Disabled Persons (Services, Consultation and Representation) Act 1986 (Commencement No. 5) Order 1989 (S.I. 1989/2425)
 County Court (Amendment No. 4) Rules 1989 (S.I. 1989/2426)
 Rules of the Supreme Court (Amendment No. 4) 1989 (S.I. 1989/2427)
 Portland Harbour Fishery Order 1989 (S.I. 1989/2428)
 Petty Sessional Divisions (North Yorkshire) Order 1989 (S.I. 1989/2429)
 The East Devon (Parishes) Order 1989 S.I. 1989/2430
 Veterinary Surgeons and Veterinary Practitioners (Registration) (Amendment) Regulations Order of Council 1989 (S.I. 1989/2431)
 Merger Reference (Blue Circle, Yale and Myson) (Revocation) Order 1989 (S.I. 1989/2432)
Sports Grounds and Sporting Events (Designation) (Scotland) Amendment Order 1989 (S.I. 1989/2433)
 Safety of Sports Grounds (Designation) (Scotland) Order 1989 (S.I. 1989/2434)
 Non-Domestic Rating Contributions (England) Regulations 1989 (S.I. 1989/2435)
 Non-Domestic Rates and Community Charges (Timetable) (Scotland) Amendment Regulations 1989 (S.I. 1989/2436)
 Standard Community Charge (Scotland) Regulations 1989 (S.I. 1989/2437)
 Excise Duties (Hydrocarbon Oil) (Travelling Showmen) Relief Regulations 1989 (S.I. 1989/2439)
 Non-Domestic Rating Contributions (Wales) Regulations 1989 (S.I. 1989/2441)
 Medicines (Intermediate Medicated Feeding Stuffs) Order 1989 (S.I. 1989/2442)
 Undersized Crabs (Variation) Order 1989 (S.I. 1989/2443)
 National Savings Bank (Investment Deposits) (Limits) (Amendment) Order 1989 (S.I. 1989/2444)
 Local Government and Housing Act 1989 (Commencement No. 3) Order 1989 (S.I. 1989/2445)
 Education Support Grants (Amendment) Regulations 1989 (S.I. 1989/2446)
 Mackerel (Specified Sea Areas) (Prohibition of Fishing) Order 1989 (S.I. 1989/2447)
 Electricity Act 1989 (Nominated Companies) (Scotland) Order 1989 (S.I. 1989/2448)
 Anglerfish (Specified Sea Areas) (Prohibition of Fishing) Order 1989 (S.I. 1989/2449)
 Brunei (Appeals) Act 1989 (Commencement) Order 1989 S.I. 1989/2450)
 Town and Country Planning (Liverpool and Wirral Urban Development Area) Special Development Order 1989 (S.I. 1989/2454)
 A30 Trunk Road (Eastern Green to Market Place, Penzance) (Detrunking) Order 1989 (S.I. 1989/2455)
 Non-Domestic Rates (Scotland) Regulations 1989 (S.I. 1989/2462)
 Limits on Rent Increases (Housing Associations) (Scotland) Order 1989 (S.I. 1989/2468)
 Limits on Rent Increases (Scotland) Order 1989 (S.I. 1989/2469)
 Merseyside Residuary Body (Winding Up) Order 1989 (S.I. 1989/2470)
 British Gas plc (Rateable Values) Order 1989 (S.I. 1989/2471)
 British Waterways Board (Rateable Values) Order 1989 (S.I. 1989/2472)
 Docks and Harbours (Rateable Values) Order 1989 (S.I. 1989/2473)
 Electricity Generators (Rateable Values) Order 1989 (S.I. 1989/2474)
 Electricity Supply Industry (Rateable Values) Order 1989 (S.I. 1989/2475)
 Non-Domestic Rating (Transitional Period) (Appropriate Fraction) Order 1989 (S.I. 1989/2476)
 Railways (Rateable Values) Order 1989 Approved by both Houses of ParliamentS.I. 1989/2477)
 Telecommunications Industry (Rateable Values) Order 1989 (S.I. 1989/2478)
 Water Undertakers (Rateable Values) Order 1989 (S.I. 1989/2479)
 Human Organ Transplants (Unrelated Persons) Regulations 1989 (S.I. 1989/2480)
 Local Government Act 1988 (Competition in Sports and Leisure Facilities) Order 1989 (S.I. 1989/2488)
 Oldham Metropolitan Borough Council (A627(M) Rochdale-Lancashire/Yorkshire Motorway (M62)-Oldham Special Roads) Revocation Scheme 1989 Confirmation Instrument 1989 (S.I. 1989/2490)
 Rochdale Borough Council (A627(M) Rochdale—Lancashire/Yorkshire Motorway (M62)—Oldham Special Roads) Revocation Scheme 1989 Confirmation Instrument 1989 (S.I. 1989/2491)
 Caernarfon Harbour Revision Order 1989 (S.I. 1989/2493)
 Submarine Pipe-lines (Designated Owners) (No. 26) Order 1989 (S.I. 1989/2495)
 Submarine Pipe-lines (Designated Owners) (No. 27) Order 1989 (S.I. 1989/2496)
 Submarine Pipe-lines (Designated Owners) (No. 28) Order 1989 (S.I. 1989/2497)
 Submarine Pipe-lines (Designated Owners) (No. 29) Order 1989 (S.I. 1989/2498)
 Submarine Pipe-lines (Designated Owners) (No. 30) Order 1989 (S.I. 1989/2499)
 Submarine Pipe-lines (Designated Owners) (No. 31) Order 1989 (S.I. 1989/2500)

2501–2600

 Submarine Pipe-lines (Designated Owners) (No. 32) Order 1989 (S.I. 1989/2501)
 Submarine Pipe-lines (Designated Owners) (No. 33) Order 1989 (S.I. 1989/2502)
 Submarine Pipe-lines (Designated Owners) (No. 34) Order 1989 (S.I. 1989/2503)
 Submarine Pipe-lines (Designated Owners) (No. 35) Order 1989 (S.I. 1989/2504)
 Submarine Pipe-lines (Designated Owners) (No. 36) Order 1989 (S.I. 1989/2505)
 Submarine Pipe-lines (Designated Owners) (No. 37) Order 1989 (S.I. 1989/2506)
 Submarine Pipe-lines (Designated Owners) (No. 38) Order 1989 (S.I. 1989/2507)
 Submarine Pipe-lines (Designated Owners) (No. 39) Order 1989 (S.I. 1989/2508)
 Copyright (Recording for Archives of Designated Class of Broadcasts and Cable Programmes) (Designated Bodies) (No. 2) Order 1989 (S.I. 1989/2510)

External links
Legislation.gov.uk delivered by the UK National Archive
UK SI's on legislation.gov.uk
UK Draft SI's on legislation.gov.uk

See also
List of Statutory Instruments of the United Kingdom

Lists of Statutory Instruments of the United Kingdom
Statutory Instruments